= List of George Washington University alumni =

This list of George Washington University alumni includes numerous prominent politicians, including a recent U.S. attorney general, four heads of state or government, CEOs of major corporations, scientists, Nobel laureates, MacArthur fellows, Olympic athletes, Academy Award and Golden Globe winners, royalty, and Time 100 notables.

== Academia and education ==
William Greenleaf Eliot

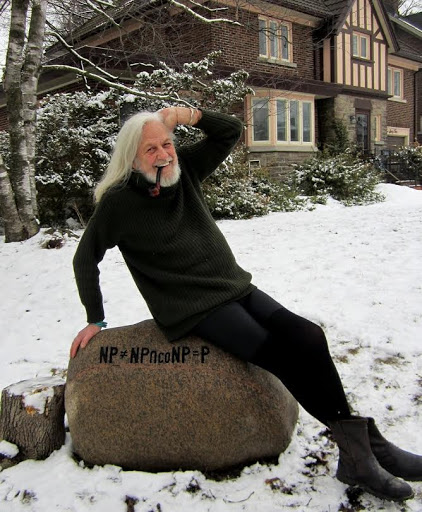
Jack Edmonds

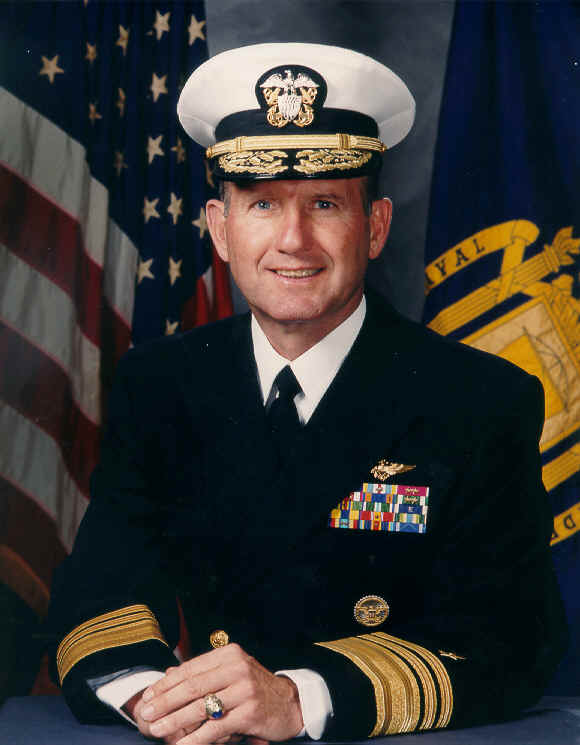
John R. Ryan

- Clinton E. Adams, president of Rocky Vista University
- Myron Augsburger, president of Eastern Mennonite University
- George F. Baughman, president of the New College of Florida
- Derek Curtis Bok, president of Harvard University
- Sissela Bok, professor of philosophy at Brandeis University
- Walter M. Bortz III, president of Hampden–Sydney College
- Lisa Bowleg, professor of Applied Social Psychology
- Curley Byrd, president of University of Maryland, College Park
- Jay Carsey, president of College of Southern Maryland
- Preston Cloud, geologist and faculty of Harvard University, University of Minnesota, University of California, Los Angeles, and the University of California, Santa Barbara
- Lotus Coffman, president of the University of Minnesota
- Scott Cowen, president of Tulane University
- William Carey Crane, president of Baylor University
- Jack Edmonds, computer scientist, faculty of the University of Waterloo's Faculty of Mathematics
- William Greenleaf Eliot, founder of Washington University in St. Louis
- John T. Fey, president of the University of Vermont and president of University of Wyoming
- H. Edward Flentje, president of Emporia State University
- Joanne Glasser, president of Bradley University and president of Eastern Kentucky University
- Glenda Glover, president of Tennessee State University
- William Halal, professor emeritus of management, technology and innovation at George Washington University
- Andrew Hartman, professor of History in the College of Arts and Sciences at Illinois State University
- Todd B. Hawley, founder of the International Space University
- Brooks Hays, professor at Rutgers University, the University of Massachusetts Amherst, and institute director at Wake Forest University
- Ricardo Jaar, president of the University of San Pedro Sula
- Michael Kammen, professor in the Cornell University Department of History; winner of the 1973 Pulitzer Prize for History
- Ellyn Kaschak, 1968, emeritus professor of psychology, Ohio State University
- Mark Kennedy, president of University of North Dakota
- Joseph E. B. Lumbard, Islamic scholar and professor at The American University of Sharjah
- Floretta Dukes McKenzie, superintendent of District of Columbia Public Schools, Chief State School Officer of the District of Columbia
- Gustavo A. Mellander, president of Passaic College, Mission College; chancellor of Inter American University, West Valley and Mission College District; graduate dean emeritus, George Mason University; member of New Jersey State Board of Education
- Gail Mellow, president of LaGuardia Community College
- Cynthia H. Milligan, dean of the College of Business Administration at the University of Nebraska–Lincoln
- Maurice F. Neufeld, professor emeritus, Cornell University
- Martha Lucas Pate, president of Sweet Briar College
- Roger Pilon, vice president of the Cato Institute
- Carolynn Reid-Wallace, president of Fisk University; assistant secretary of education for postsecondary education
- Charles P. Roland (did not graduate), history professor emeritus of the University of Kentucky
- John R. Ryan, chancellor of the State University of New York and superintendent of United States Naval Academy
- Robert Ryland, president of the University of Richmond
- Peter Schweizer, president of Government Accountability Institute
- Portia Holmes Shields, president of Albany State University, interim president of Tennessee State University
- Gary Sick, Middle East analyst and academic at the Columbia University School of International and Public Affairs
- Morris G. Steen Jr., president of North Florida College
- Thomas B. Symons, president of University of Maryland, College Park
- Rosalyn Terborg-Penn, historian and faculty member of Morgan State University
- Henry Holcombe Tucker, president of the University of Georgia
- Ernest L. Wilkinson, president of Brigham Young University
- Arthur Cutts Willard, president of the University of Illinois system
- Gregory H. Williams, president of the University of Cincinnati and the City College of New York
- John T. Wilson, president of the University of Chicago
- Meyrav Wurmser, professor of political science at Johns Hopkins University and the US Naval Academy
- Irvin D. Yalom, existential psychiatrist and emeritus professor of psychiatry at Stanford University
- Michael K. Young, president of Texas A&M University, the University of Washington, and the University of Utah
- Melinda Zook, Germaine Seelye Oesterle Professor of History at Purdue University

=== Museums and libraries ===
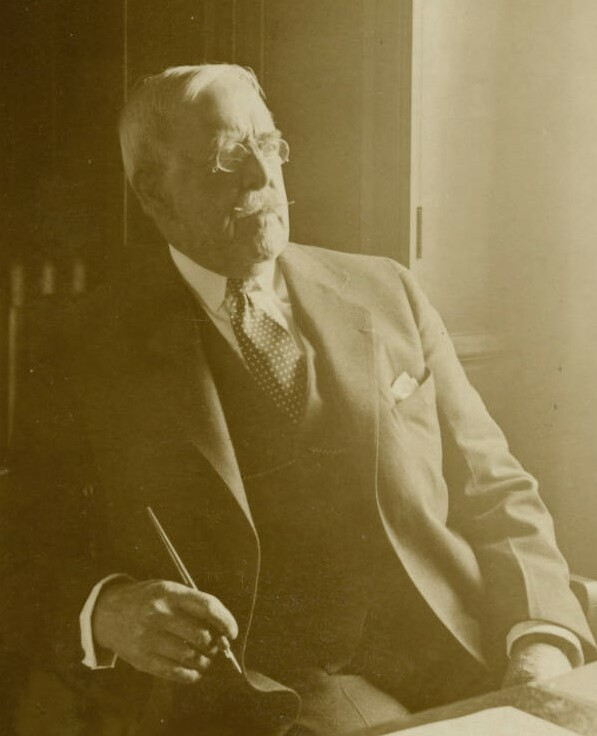
Harrison Howell Dodge

- Jessie G. Beach, paleontologist with the Smithsonian Institution's department of paleobiology
- Lindsay Chervinsky, presidential historian; executive director of the George Washington Presidential Library at Mount Vernon
- Bettye Collier-Thomas, founder of Mary McLeod Bethune Memorial Museum and National Archives for Black Women's History
- Harrison Howell Dodge (1852–1937), resident superintendent of Mount Vernon
- Elizabeth B. Drewry (BA, MA), archivist, National Archives and the Franklin D. Roosevelt Presidential Library and Museum
- Dan Weiss, art historian and museum executive; former CEO of the Metropolitan Museum of Art and current CEO of the Philadelphia Museum of Art

== Activism and nonprofits ==
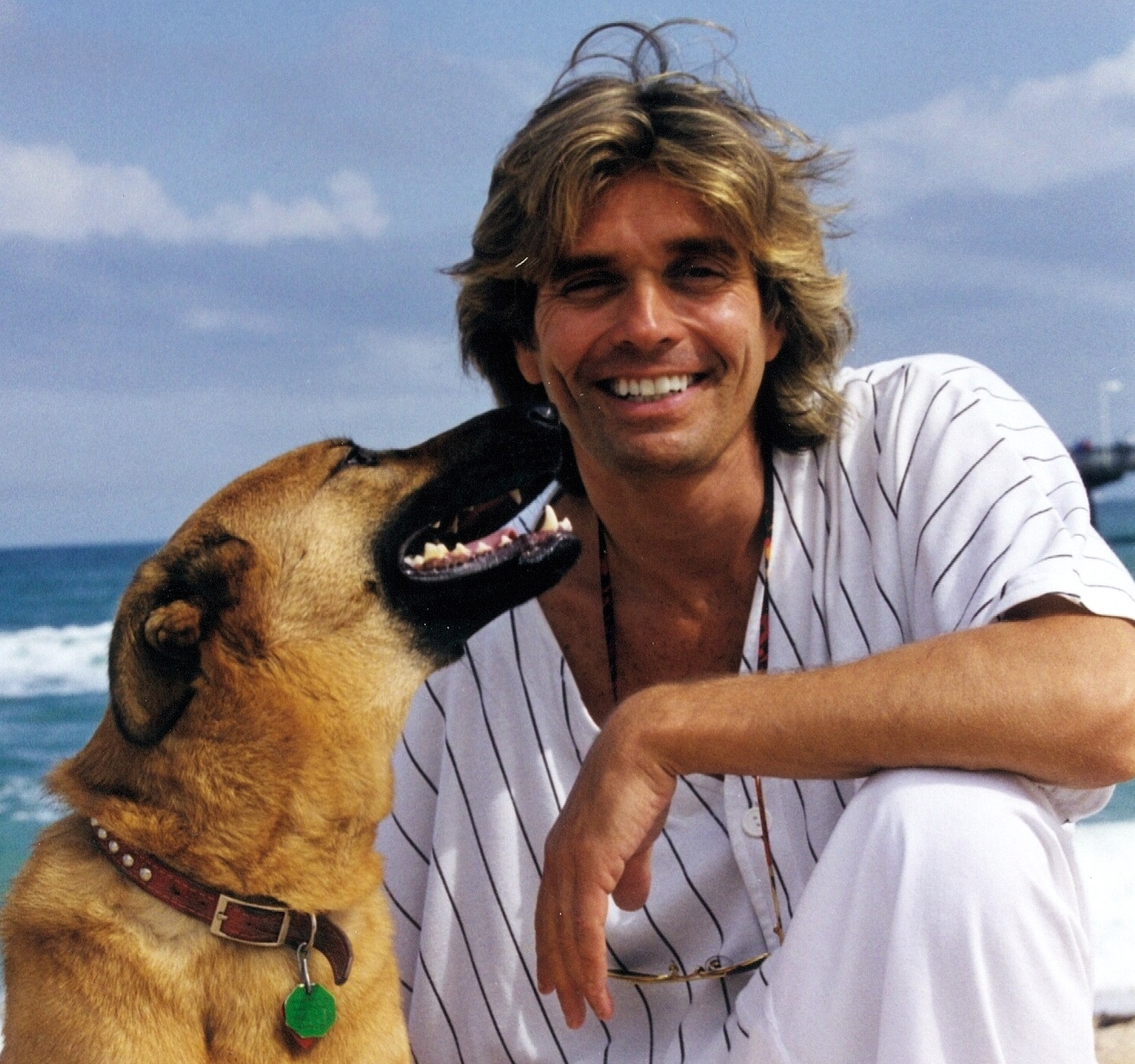
Alex Pacheco

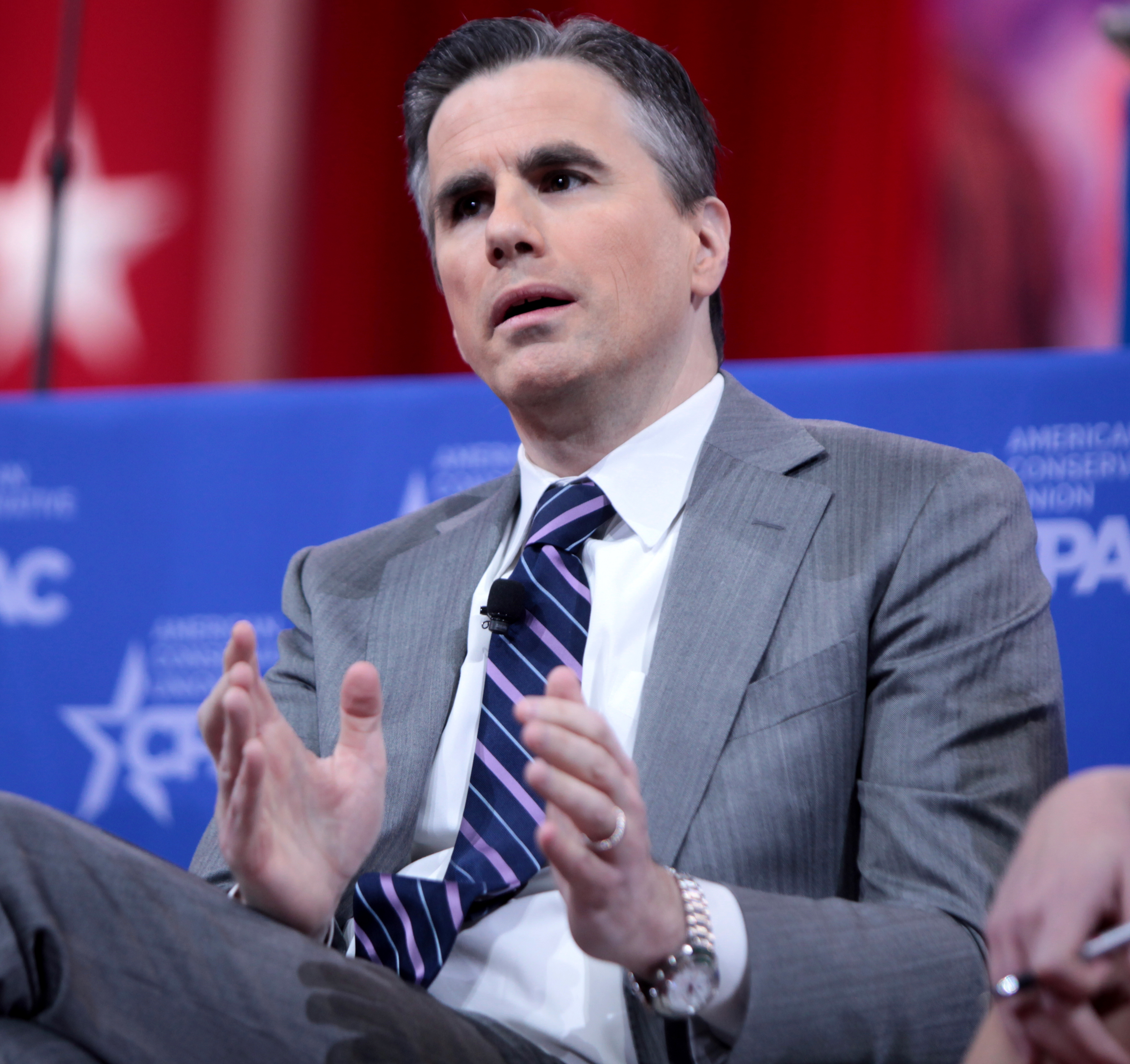
Tom Fitton

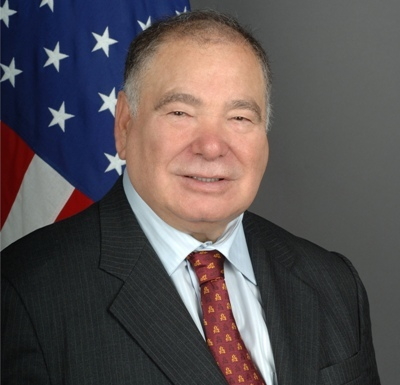
Raul Yzaguirre

- Rita Banerji, gender activist
- Henry Berg-Brousseau, transgender rights activist
- Roslyn Brock, chairman of the NAACP
- Dorothy Vredenburgh Bush, political activist
- Peggy Cooper Cafritz, civil rights activist
- Kraisak Choonhavan, Thai human rights activist
- Richard Cizik, environmental activist
- David A. Clarke, civil rights activist
- Watson Davis, science education activist
- Tom Fitton, president of Judicial Watch
- Jason Franklin, urban policy activist
- Marc Garlasco, senior military expert for Human Rights Watch
- Margery E. Goldberg, public arts activist
- Mildred Harnack, resistance fighter in Nazi Germany who was beheaded by the Gestapo
- Jane Briggs Hart, anti-war activist
- Jeanne Henriquez, women's rights activist
- Ida Hinman, suffragette and feminist activist
- Jonathan D. Katz (BA '81), founder of Queer Nation
- Kivutha Kibwana, Kenyan human rights activist
- Brittany Lewis, domestic violence activist
- Ángel Lozada, HIV activist
- Bari Lurie, chief of staff at the Clinton Foundation
- Ellen Malcolm, founder and president of EMILYs List
- Kati Marton, chairwoman of the International Women's Health Coalition
- Stephanie K. Meeks, CEO of the National Trust for Historic Preservation
- Mona Al Munajjed, sociologist who started Activating the Role of Women's Welfare Associations in Saudi Arabia
- Alex Pacheco, co-founder and Chairman of PETA
- Amien Rais, leader of the Indonesian reform movement
- Zohra Rasekh, doctor and women's rights activist
- Arlene Raven, feminist activist
- Nikolas Schiller, cannabis reform activist
- Mercedes Schlapp, Tea Party movement activist
- Paul Shapiro, vice president of the Humane Society of the United States
- Omega Silva, universal health care activist
- Kim A. Snyder, chronic fatigue syndrome activist
- A. L. Steiner, co-founder of Working Artists and the Greater Economy (W.A.G.E.)
- Marc Tucker, founder and president of the National Center on Education and the Economy
- Wong Chin Foo, Chinese-American activist
- Raul Yzaguirre, president and CEO of the National Council of La Raza

== Art and architecture ==
- Patricia Altschul, socialite and art collector
- Reem Bassous, visual artist
- Ned Bittinger, portrait painter and illustrator
- Irvin Bomb, artist
- Christopher Pearse Cranch, artist and writer
- Alfred McAdams, painter
- Nikolas Schiller, creator of Geospatial art and abstract fantasy maps
- Cleon Throckmorton, painter, set designer, and architect
- John Appleton Wilson, architect
- Jan Van Dyke, dancer, choreographer, and dance educator; pioneer of modern and contemporary dance

== Business ==
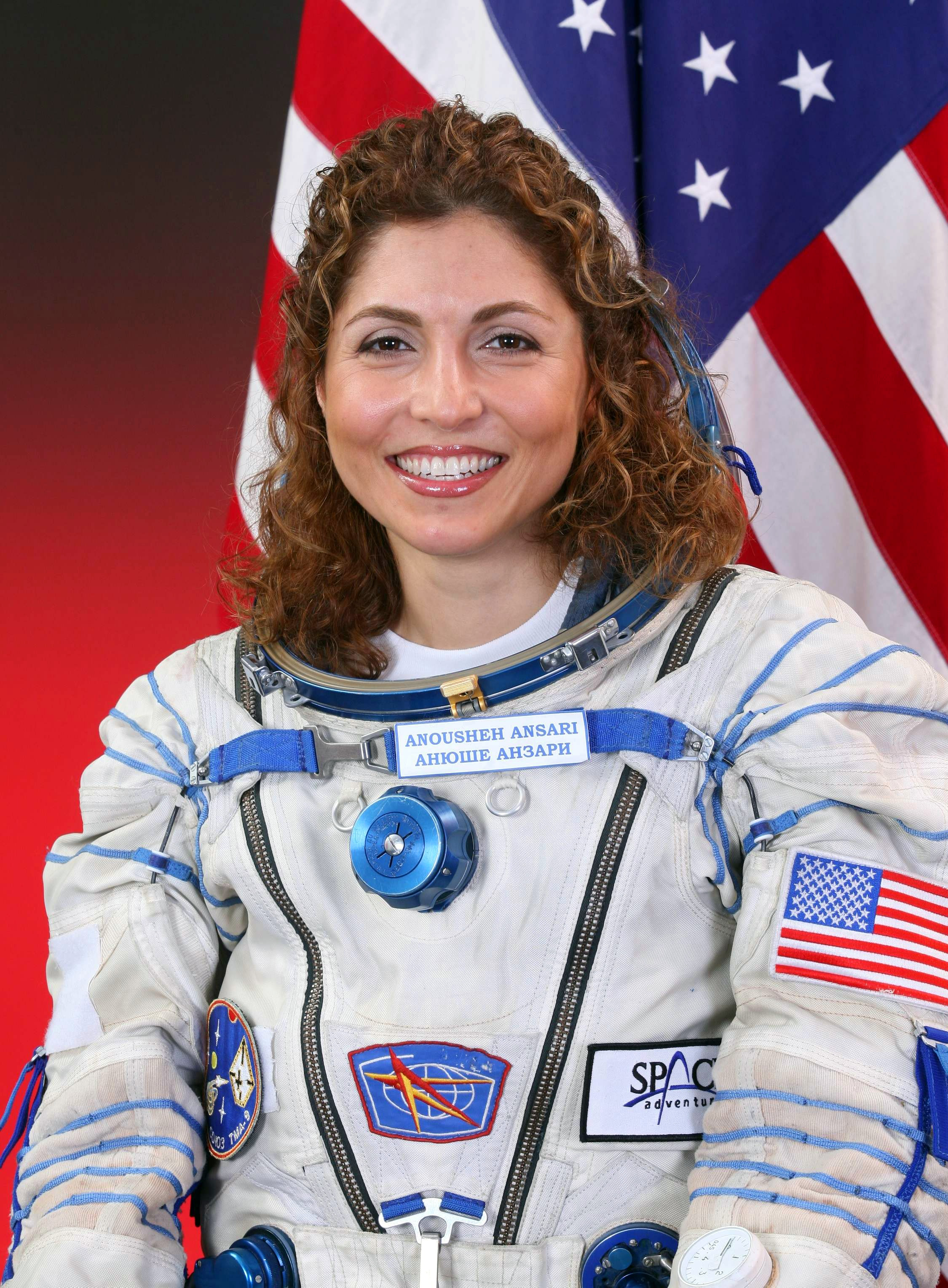
Anousheh Ansari

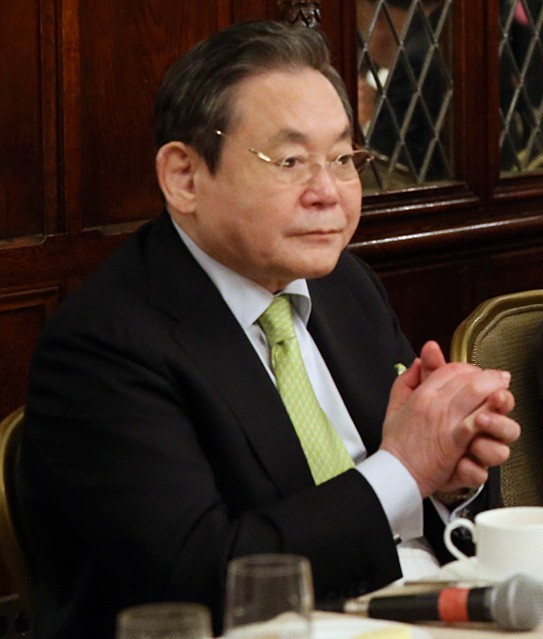
Lee Kun-Hee

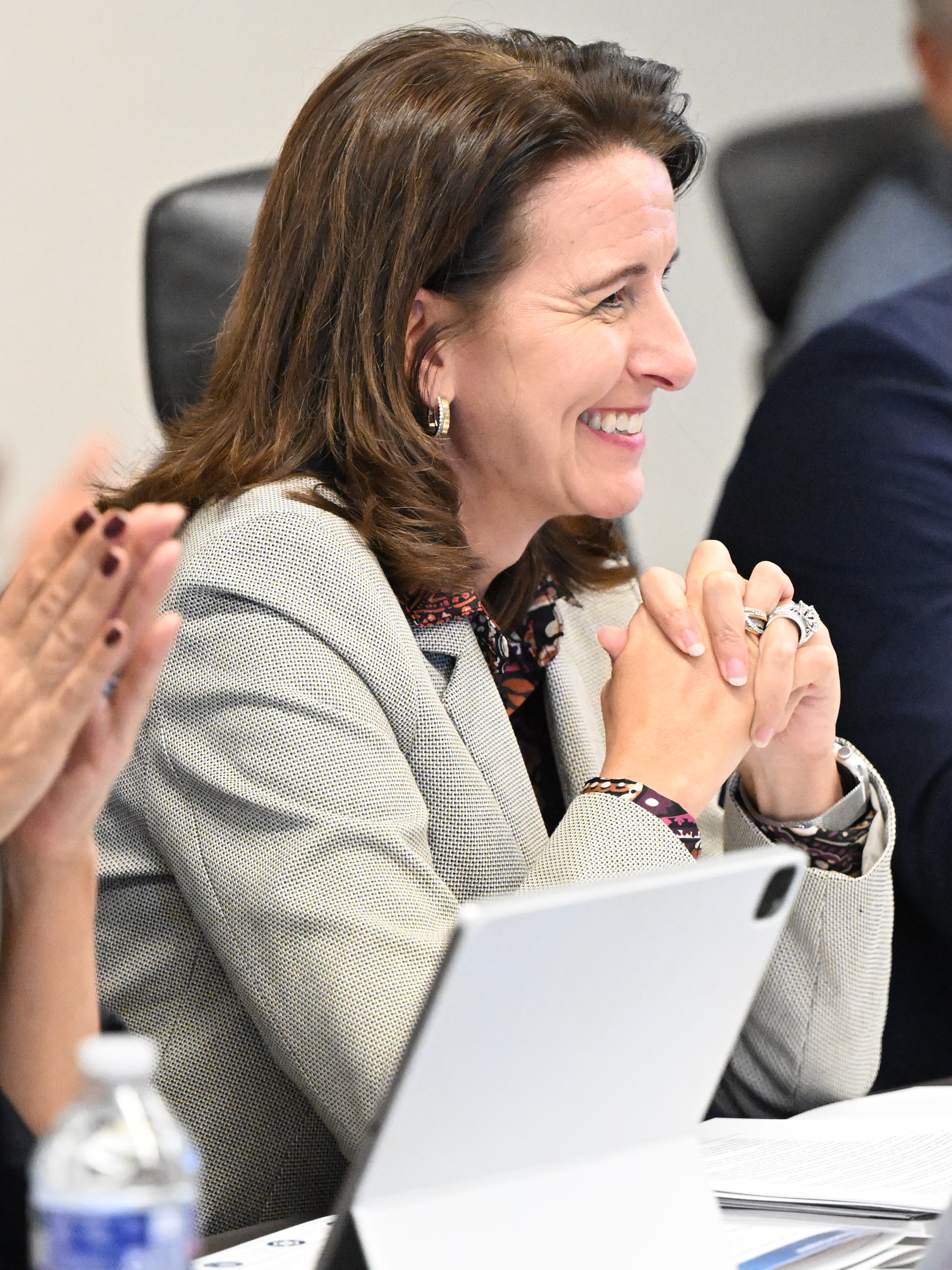
Kathy J. Warden

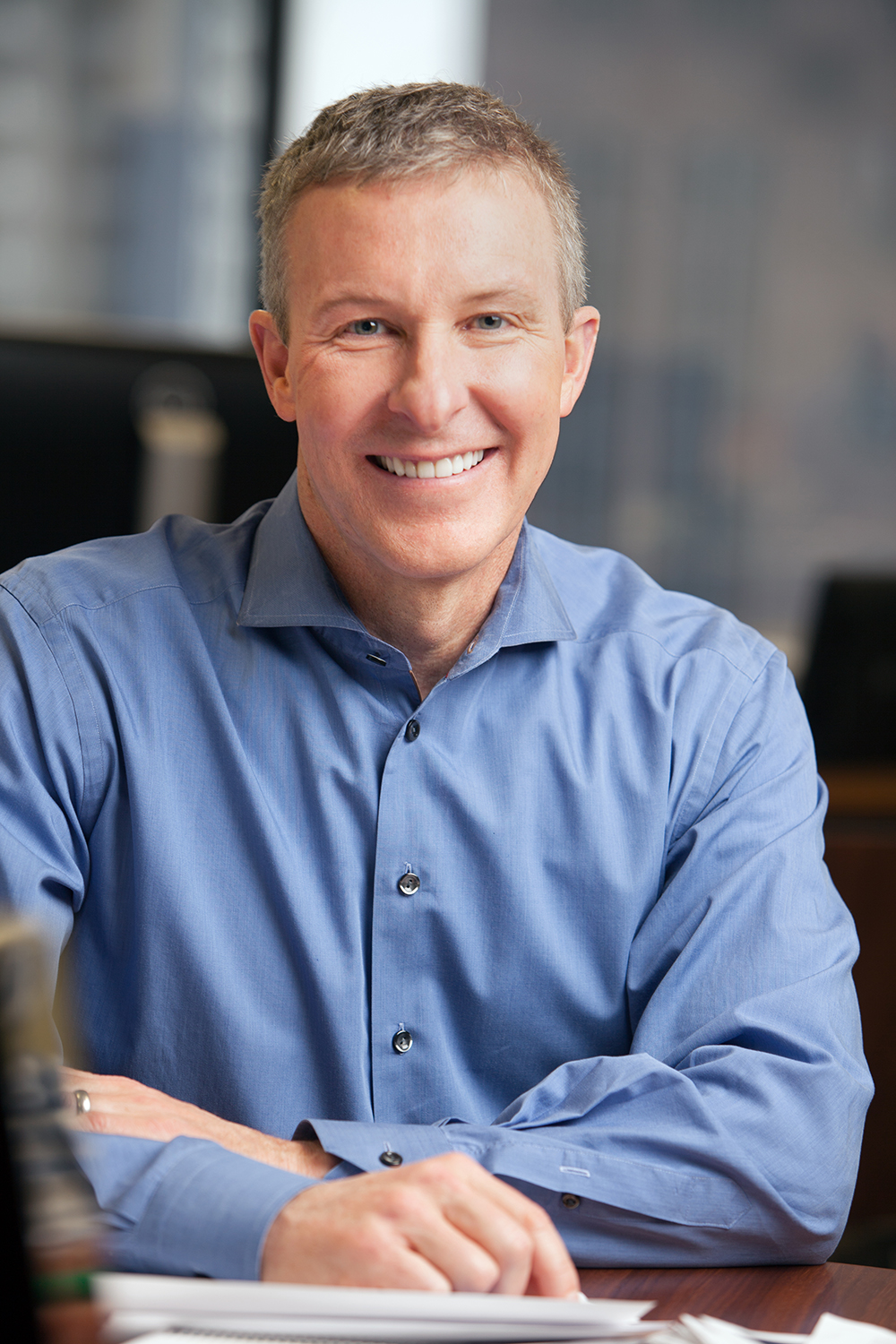
Scott Kirby

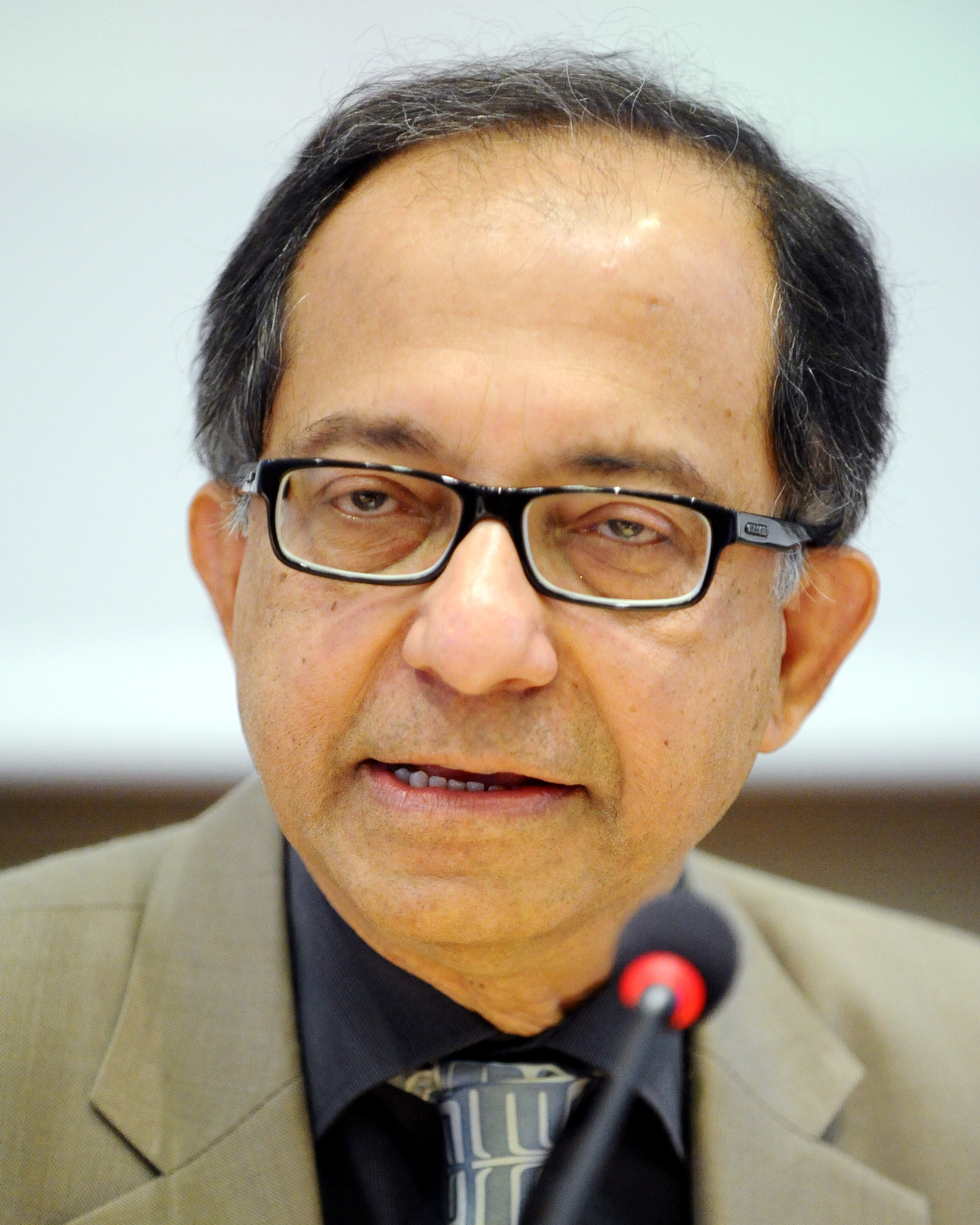
Kaushik Basu

- Chris Anderson, CEO of 3D Robotics
- Anousheh Ansari (M.S. 1992), chairwoman and co-founder of Prodea Systems; CEO of the X Prize Foundation
- Ronald S. Baron, mutual fund manager and founder of Baron Capital
- Kaushik Basu, chief economist of the World Bank
- Michael Beckerman, CEO of the Internet Association
- Dan Berger, president and CEO of the National Association of Federally-Insured Credit Unions
- James C. Boland, vice chairman of Ernst & Young
- Jennifer Boykin, president of Newport News Shipbuilding and vice president of Huntington Ingalls Industries
- General John T. Chain Jr., director at R. J. Reynolds Tobacco Company and ConAgra Foods, Inc.
- Henry Cisneros, president of Univision
- J. R. Claeys, CEO of the National Association of Government Contractors
- Abby Joseph Cohen, managing director of Goldman Sachs
- Rafael Corpus, chairman of the Philippine National Bank
- L. Stanley Crane, CEO of Southern Railway and Consolidated Rail Corporation
- Nancy Davis, founder and CIO of Quadratic Capital Management
- Lester del Rey, founder of Del Rey Books
- Linda Fisher, vice president of Monsanto Company; vice president of DuPont
- Guilford Glazer, real estate developer
- Lawrence R. Goldfarb, CEO of LRG Capital Group
- Mindy Grossman, CEO of Weight Watchers Intl.
- Stephen G. Haines, organizational theorist and management consultant
- Pedro Heilbron, CEO of Copa Holdings, S.A.
- Donna Hrinak, president of Boeing Latin America
- Lin Jianhai, secretary general of the International Monetary Fund
- Clayton M. Jones, chairman of Rockwell Collins
- David Kellermann, acting CFO of Freddie Mac
- Mugo Kibati, CEO of Telkom Kenya
- Scott Kirby, CEO of United Airlines
- David Klein (PhD '71), governor of the Bank of Israel
- Mustafa Koç, president of Koç Holding
- Kenneth Lay, CEO and chairman of Enron
- Lee Kun-Hee, chairman of Samsung Group
- Theodore Lerner, real estate developer
- Ed Liddy, chairman of Allstate and AIG
- Jack London, executive chairman and chairman of the board of CACI
- Alvan Macauley, president of Packard
- Yasseen Mansour, part owner of the Mansour Group
- Darla Moore (MBA), partner of the private investment firm, Rainwater, Inc.; founder of Palmetto Institute
- Nate Morris, businessman and politician
- Rob Nichols, president and CEO of the American Bankers Association and the Financial Services Forum
- Roy Nouhra, founder and CEO of ASIS boats
- Donald Nyrop, president and CEO of Northwest Airlines
- Mosheh Oinounou, media executive and executive producer of CBS News
- William Owens, CEO of Nortel
- Sandra Pianalto, 10th president of the Federal Reserve Bank of Cleveland
- Michael Punke, vice president of Amazon Web Services
- John F. W. Rogers, chief of staff and partner at Goldman Sachs
- Joe Rospars, CEO of Blue State Digital
- James A. Runde, vice chairman of Morgan Stanley
- Amina Al Rustamani, CEO of the TECOM Group
- Bruce Sewell, senior vice president at Apple
- Afnan Al-Shuaiby, secretary general of the Arab British Chamber of Commerce
- José Julián Sidaoui, deputy-governor of the Bank of Mexico
- Douglas Steenland, president and CEO of Northwest Airlines
- Bill Studeman, vice president and deputy general manager of mission systems at Northrop Grumman
- George Uribe, founder and CEO of Guestbooker.com
- Julia Montgomery Walsh, first woman to be registered with the American Stock Exchange
- Kathy J. Warden, president and CEO of Northrop Grumman
- Christopher J. Wiernicki, CEO of the American Bureau of Shipping
- Dennis R. Wraase, CEO of Pepco Holdings
- Elaine Wynn, co-founder of Mirage Resorts and Wynn Resorts

== Diplomacy ==
=== U.S. ambassadors ===
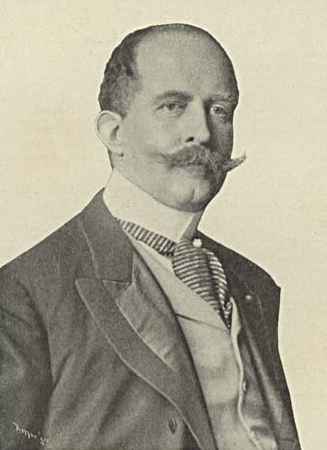
Charles Page Bryan

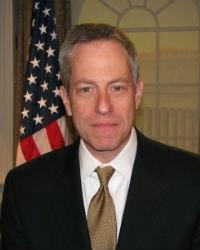
Michael Ratney

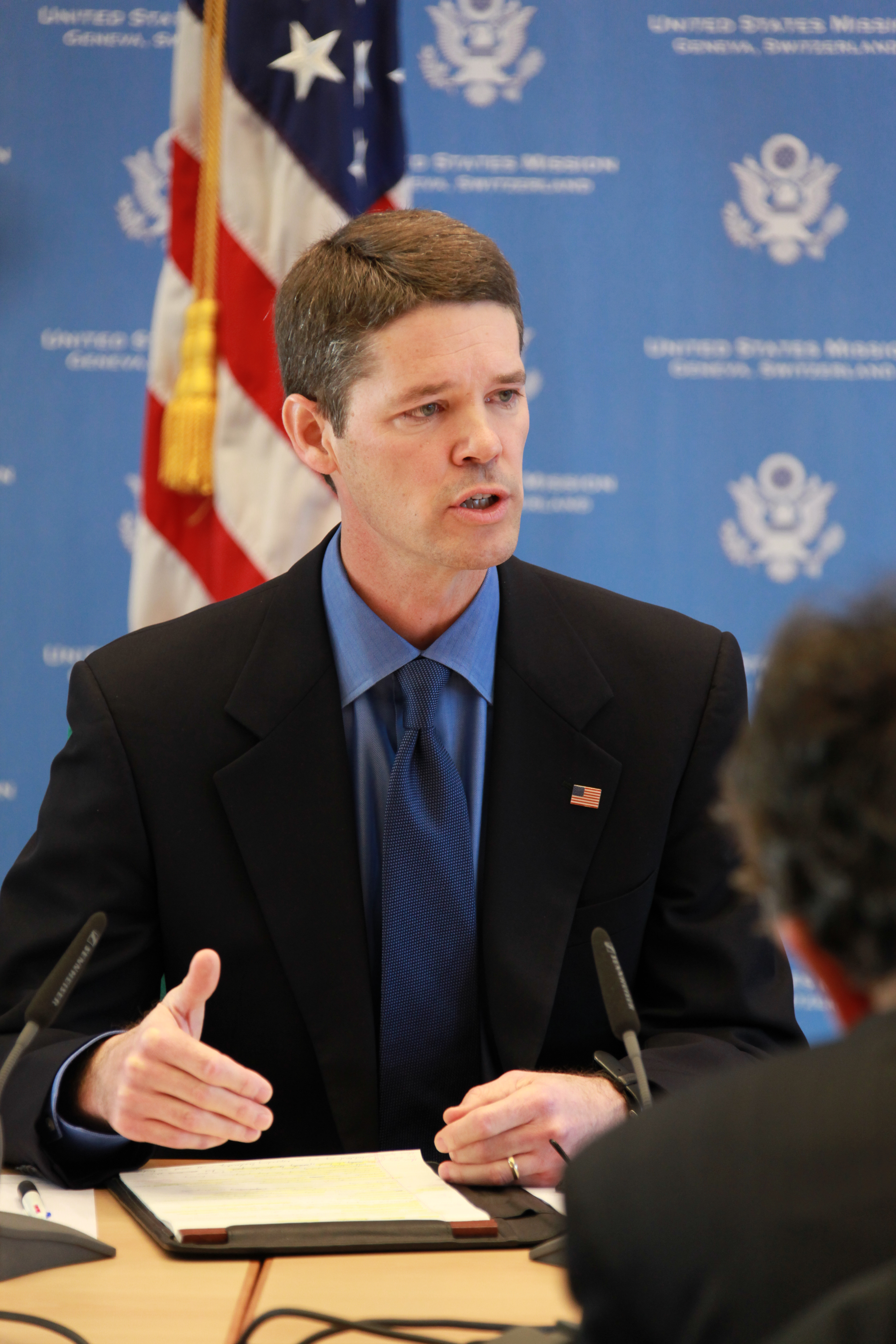
Michael Punke

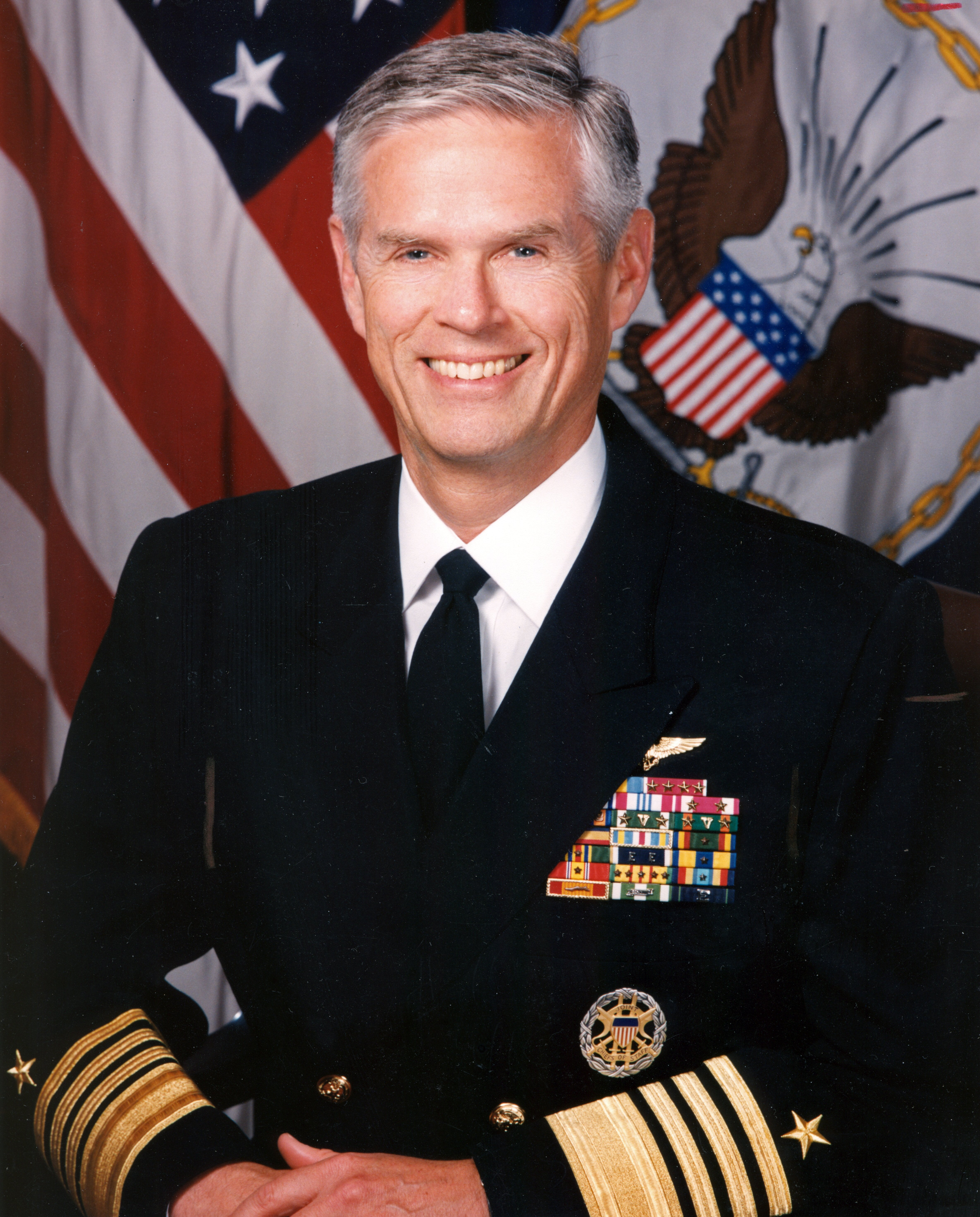
Joseph Prueher

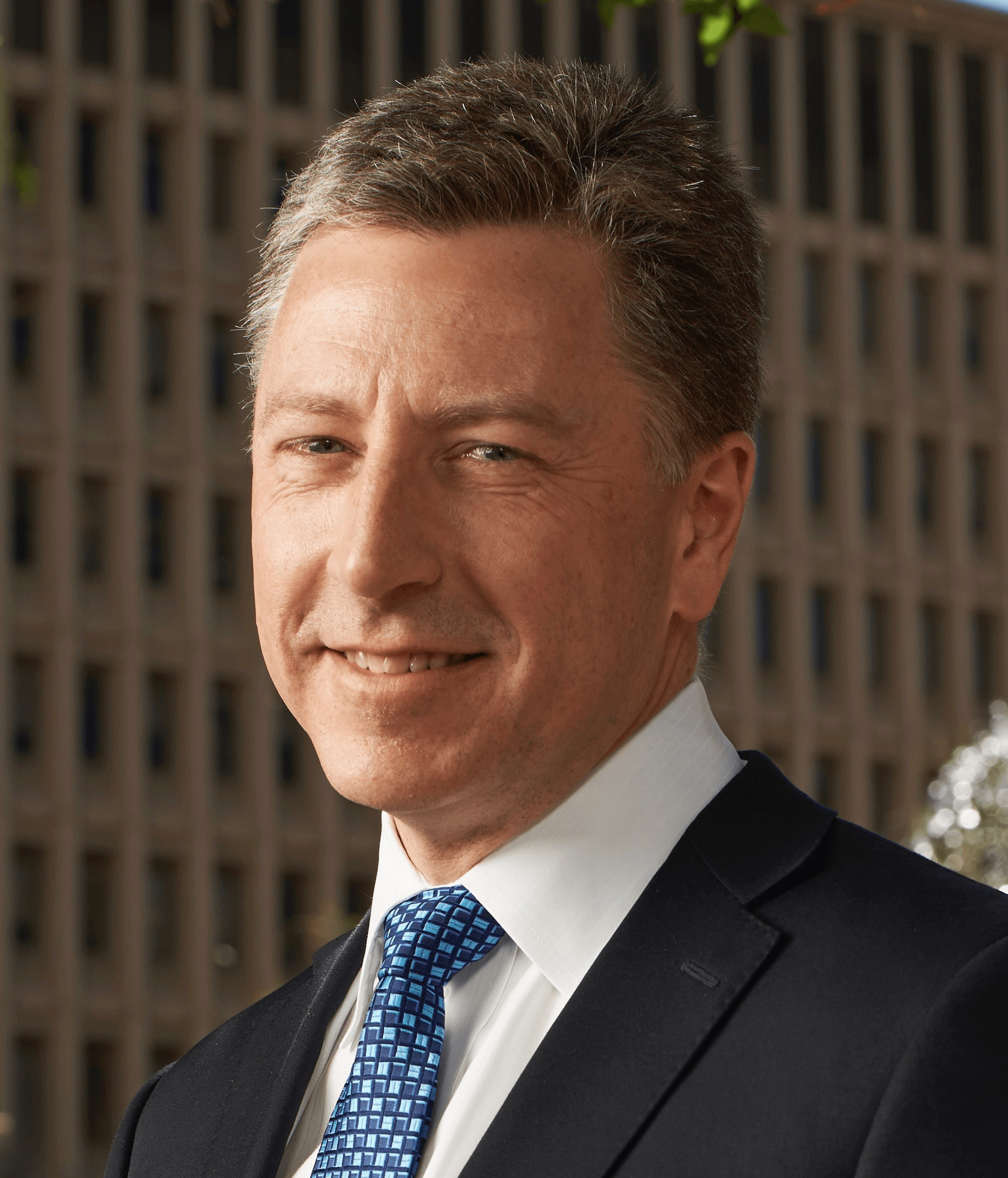
Kurt Volker

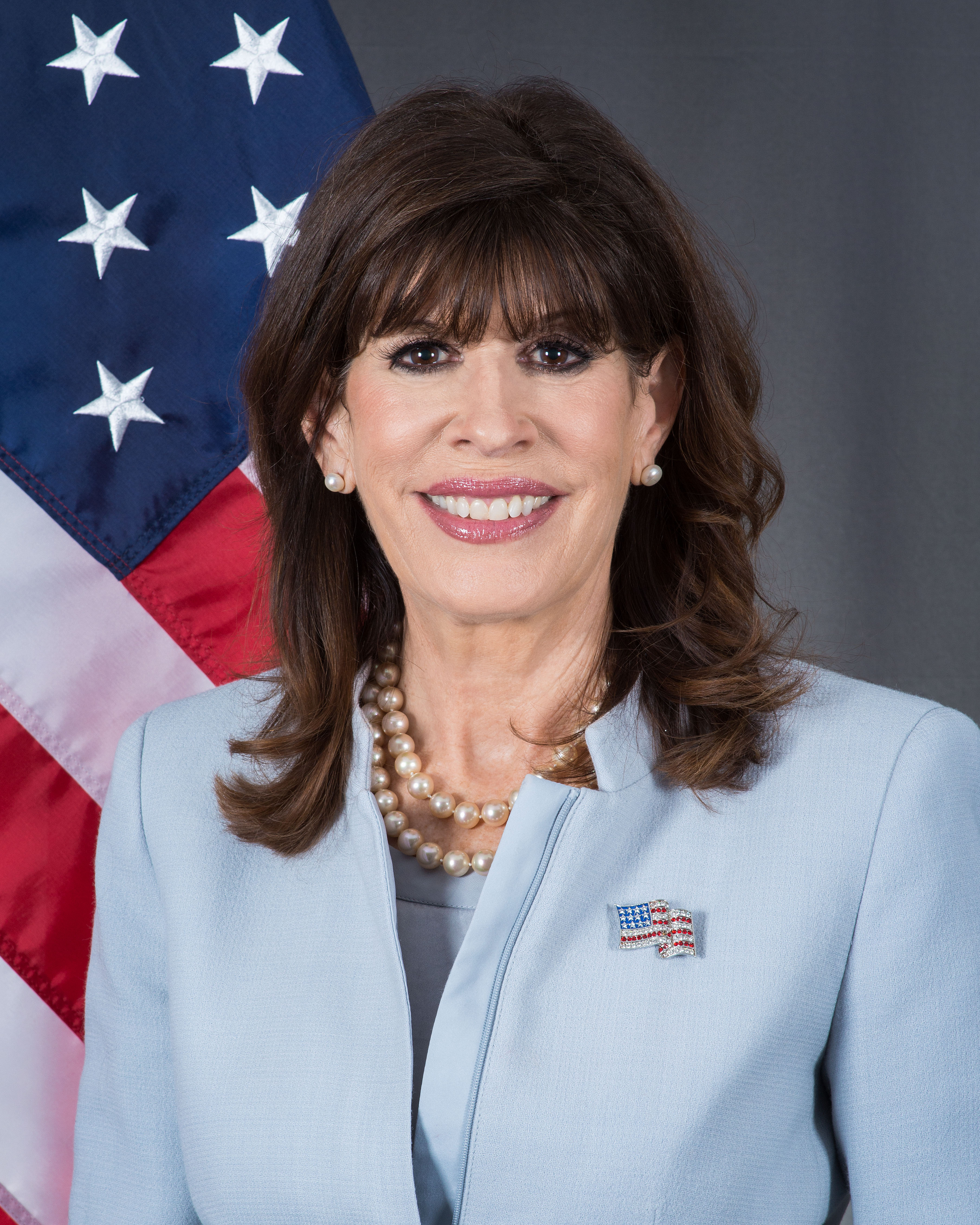
Robin Bernstein

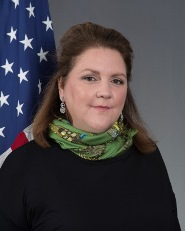
Rebecca Gonzales

- Gina Abercrombie-Winstanley, U.S. Ambassador to Malta
- Bernadette M. Allen, U.S. Ambassador to Niger
- Frank Almaguer, U.S. Ambassador to Honduras
- Cresencio S. Arcos Jr., U.S. Ambassador to Honduras
- Richard L. Baltimore, U.S. Ambassador to Oman
- William Tapley Bennett Jr., U.S. Ambassador to NATO
- Robin Bernstein, U.S. Ambassador to the Dominican Republic
- Stephen W. Bosworth, U.S. Ambassador to Tunisia, U.S. Ambassador to the Philippines, and U.S. Ambassador to South Korea
- Richard Boucher, U.S. Ambassador to Cyprus
- Ralph L. Boyce, U.S. Ambassador to Indonesia and U.S. Ambassador to Thailand
- Theodore Brentano, U.S. Ambassador to Hungary
- Everett E. Briggs, U.S. Ambassador to Portugal
- Richard C. Brown, U.S. Ambassador to Uruguay
- Charles Page Bryan, U.S. Ambassador to Brazil, U.S. Ambassador to Japan, U.S. Ambassador to Belgium, and U.S. Ambassador to Portugal
- Wiley T. Buchanan Jr., U.S. Ambassador to Luxembourg and U.S. Ambassador to Austria
- Morris D. Busby, U.S. Ambassador to Colombia
- John Cloud, U.S. Ambassador to Lithuania and U.S. Ambassador to Germany
- William Miller Collier, U.S. Ambassador to Chile and U.S. Ambassador to Spain
- James M. Derham, U.S. Ambassador to Guatemala
- Thomas J. Dodd Jr., U.S. Ambassador to Uruguay and U.S. Ambassador to Costa Rica
- Irving Bedell Dudley, U.S. Ambassador to Brazil and U.S. Ambassador to Peru
- Christine A. Elder, U.S. Ambassador to Liberia
- Charles A. Ford, U.S. Ambassador to Honduras
- Edward W. Gnehm, U.S. Ambassador to Jordan, U.S. Ambassador to Kuwait, and U.S. Ambassador to Australia
- Rebecca Gonzales, U.S. Ambassador to Lesotho
- Sergio Gor, U.S. Ambassador to India
- George W. Guthrie, U.S. Ambassador to Japan, mayor of Pittsburgh
- Sheila Gwaltney, U.S. Ambassador to Kyrgyzstan
- David C. Halsted, U.S. Ambassador to Chad and U.S. Ambassador to Uganda
- William A. Heidt, U.S. Ambassador to Cambodia
- Smith Hempstone, U.S. Ambassador to Kenya
- Aubrey Hooks, U.S.Ambassador to the Democratic Republic of the Congo, U.S. Ambassador to Ivory Coast, and U.S. Ambassador to the Republic of the Congo
- Donna Hrinak, U.S. Ambassador to Dominican Republic, U.S. Ambassador to Bolivia, and U.S. Ambassador to Venezuela
- Robert P. Jackson, U.S. Ambassador to Ghana and U.S. Ambassador to Cameroon
- Daniel A. Johnson, U.S. Ambassador to Suriname
- Donald C. Johnson, U.S. Ambassador to Cabo Verde, U.S. Ambassador to Equatorial Guinea, and U.S. Ambassador to Mongolia
- Nelson T. Johnson, U.S. Ambassador to China and U.S. Ambassador to Australia
- Robert Brendon Keating, U.S. Ambassador to Madagascar
- Harmon Elwood Kirby, U.S. Ambassador to Togo
- Carol Laise, U.S. Ambassador to Nepal
- George W. Landau, U.S. Ambassador to Paraguay, U.S. Ambassador to Chile, and U.S. Ambassador to Venezuela
- Lyle Franklin Lane, U.S. Ambassador to Uruguay
- James R. Lilley, U.S. Ambassador to China and U.S. Ambassador to South Korea
- Marisa Lino, U.S. Ambassador to Albania
- Thomas A. Loftus, U.S. Ambassador to Norway
- Charles Taylor Manatt, U.S. Ambassador to Dominican Republic; chairman of the Democratic National Committee
- Edward E. Masters, U.S. Ambassador to Indonesia
- Robert J. McCloskey, U.S. Ambassador to Greece, U.S. Ambassador to Cyprus, and U.S. Ambassador to the Netherlands
- Tom McDonald, U.S. Ambassador to Zimbabwe
- Francis Terry McNamara, U.S. Ambassador to Cabo Verde, U.S. Ambassador to Gabon, and U.S. Ambassador to São Tomé and Príncipe
- William Dale Montgomery, U.S. Ambassador to Bulgaria, U.S. Ambassador to Serbia and Montenegro, and U.S. Ambassador to Croatia
- George Moose, U.S. Ambassador to Benin and U.S. Ambassador to Senegal
- John J. Muccio, U.S. Ambassador to Guatemala, U.S. Ambassador to Iceland, and U.S. Ambassador to South Korea
- Robert Daniel Murphy, U.S. Ambassador to Japan and U.S. Ambassador to Belgium
- Tibor P. Nagy, U.S. Ambassador to Ethiopia
- Walter E. North, U.S. Ambassador to Vanuatu, U.S. Ambassador to Solomon Islands, and U.S. Ambassador to Papua New Guinea
- Frank V. Ortiz, U.S. Ambassador to Uruguay, U.S. Ambassador to Guatemala, U.S. Ambassador to Barbados, U.S. Ambassador to Peru, and U.S. Ambassador to Argentina
- Edward Peck, U.S. Ambassador to Mauritania
- Carol Z. Perez, United States Ambassador to Chile, Director General of the Foreign Service, and Under Secretary of State for Management
- John Peurifoy, U.S. Ambassador to Greece, U.S. Ambassador to Guatemala, and U.S. Ambassador to Thailand
- Joseph Prueher (1973), U.S. Ambassador to China and commander-in-chief of the United States Pacific Command
- Michael Punke, U.S. Ambassador to the World Trade Organization
- Michael Ratney, U.S. Ambassador to Saudi Arabia
- Catherine M. Russell, U.S. Ambassador-at-Large for Global Women's Issues
- Robert M. Sayre, U.S. Ambassador to Brazil, U.S. Ambassador to Panama, and U.S. Ambassador to Uruguay
- David H. Shinn, U.S. Ambassador to Ethiopia and U.S. Ambassador to Burkina Faso
- Gerald Eustis Thomas, U.S. Ambassador to Kenya and U.S. Ambassador to Guyana
- Clare H. Timberlake, U.S. Ambassador to the Democratic Republic of the Congo
- Walter Nathan Tobriner, U.S. Ambassador to Jamaica; President of the Board of Commissioners of Washington, D.C.
- Kurt Volker, U.S. Ambassador to NATO
- Julius Waring Walker Jr., U.S. Ambassador to Burkina Faso
- Alexander W. Weddell, U.S. Ambassador to Argentina and U.S. Ambassador to Spain
- John H. Wheeler, U.S. Ambassador to Nicaragua
- Ross Wilson, U.S. Ambassador to Turkey
- William Braucher Wood, U.S. Ambassador to Colombia and U.S. Ambassador to Afghanistan
- Raul Yzaguirre, U.S. Ambassador to Dominican Republic

=== U.S. consut generals ===
- Archer Blood, Consul General of the United States, Dhaka, East Pakistan
- An Le, Consulate General of the United States, Ho Chi Minh City
- Frank Lockhart, Consul General of the United States, Shanghai
- Richard Paul Momsen, Consul General of the United States, Rio de Janeiro
- Thomas Sammons, Consul General of the United States, Shanghai
- Moncrieff J. Spear, Consul General of the United States, The Bahamas
- Guilford Wiley Wells, Consul General of the United States, Shanghai

=== Other diplomats ===
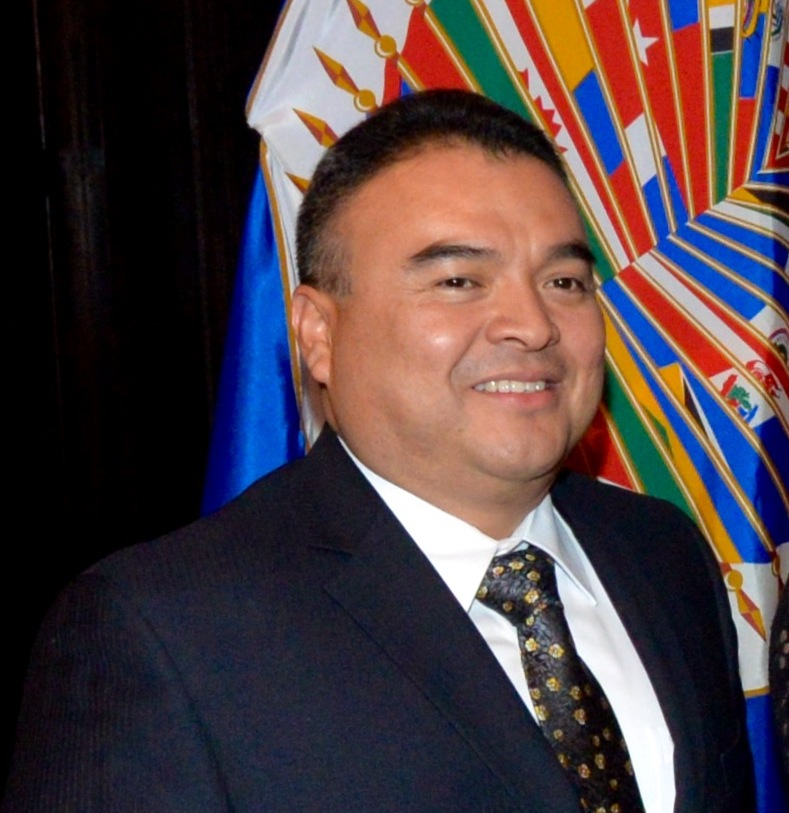
Nestor Mendez

- Pearnel Patroe Charles Jr., State Minister of Foreign Affairs and Trade of Jamaica
- Elliott Charng, Taiwanese Ambassador to Australia, New Zealand, and India
- Camillo Gonsalves, permanent representative of Saint Vincent and the Grenadines to the United Nations
- Kazuyuki Hamada, Vice Minister of Foreign Affairs of Japan
- Joe Hung (PhD history, 1981),, Taiwanese Ambassador to Italy
- Carl Lutz, Swiss Vice-Consul for Budapest
- George Maior, Romanian Ambassador to the United States
- Nestor Mendez, Assistant Secretary General of the Organization of American States
- Mao Ning, Spokesperson of the Ministry of Foreign Affairs of China
- Henrique Valle, deputy Ambassador of Brazil to the United Nations

== Entertainment ==
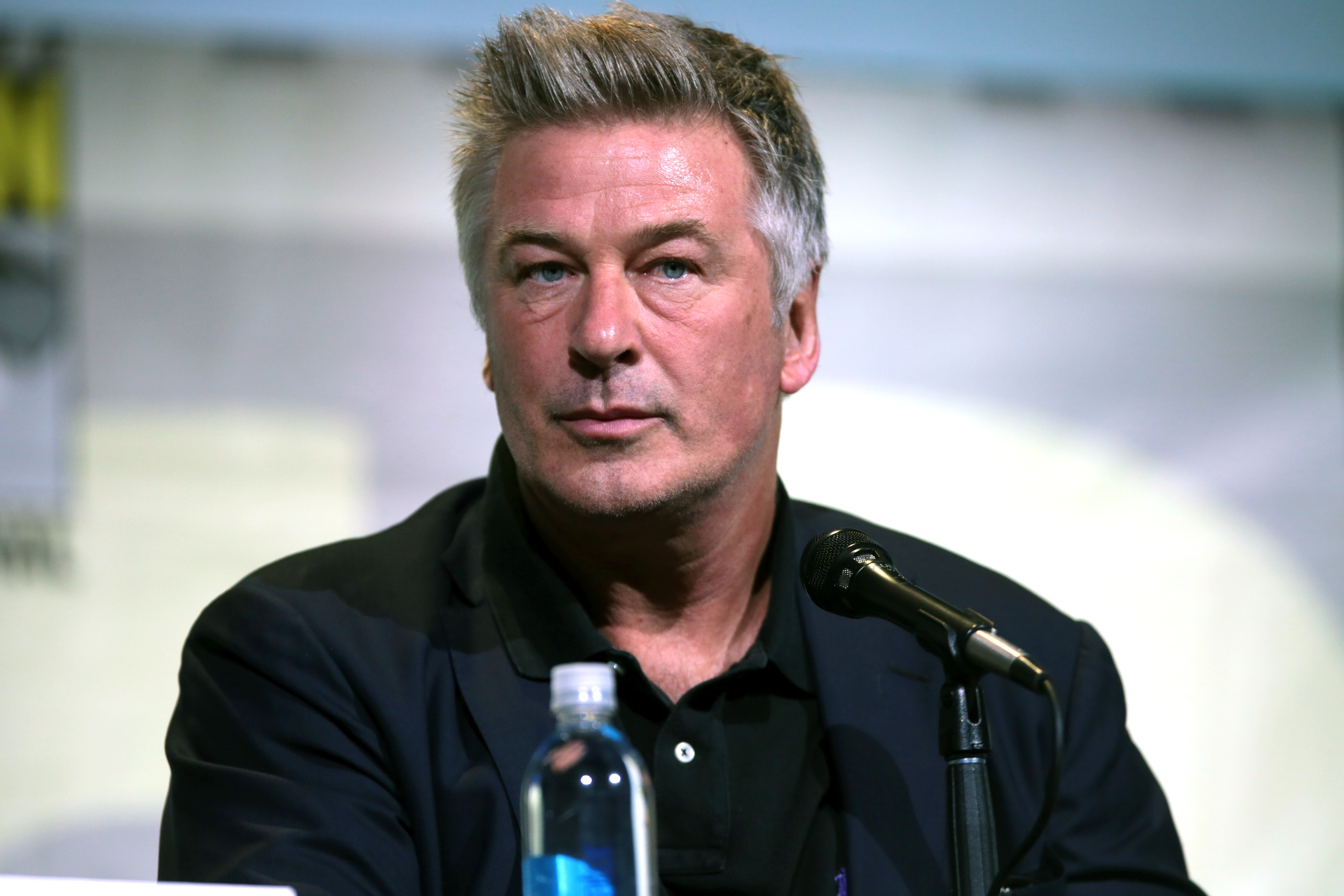
Alec Baldwin

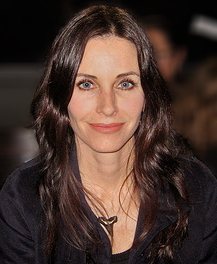
Courteney Cox

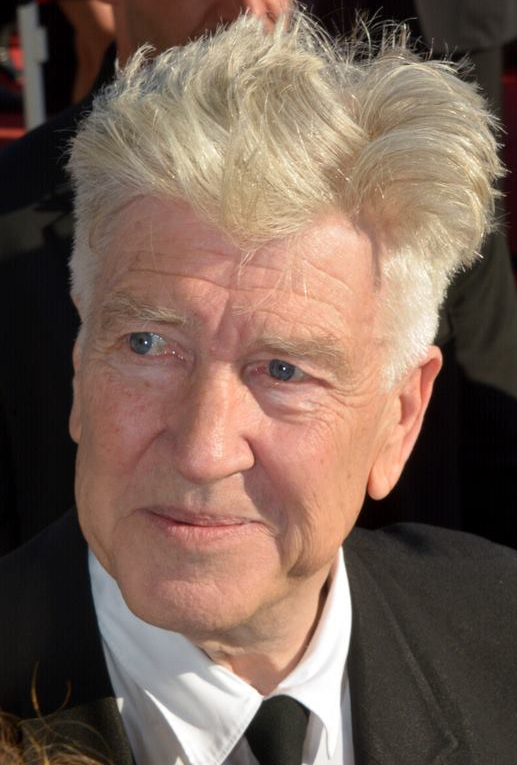
David Lynch

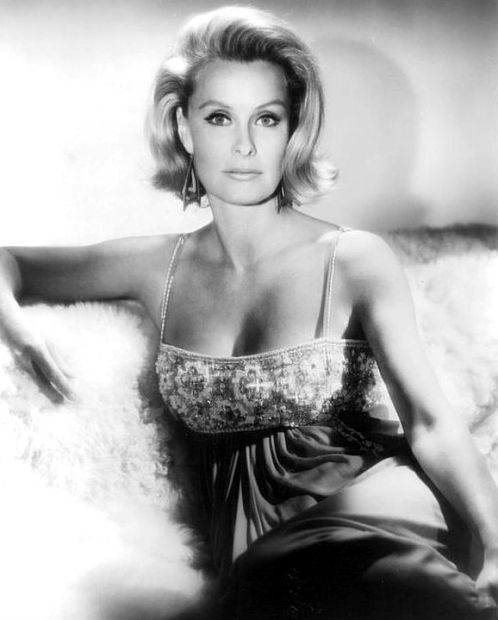
Dina Merrill

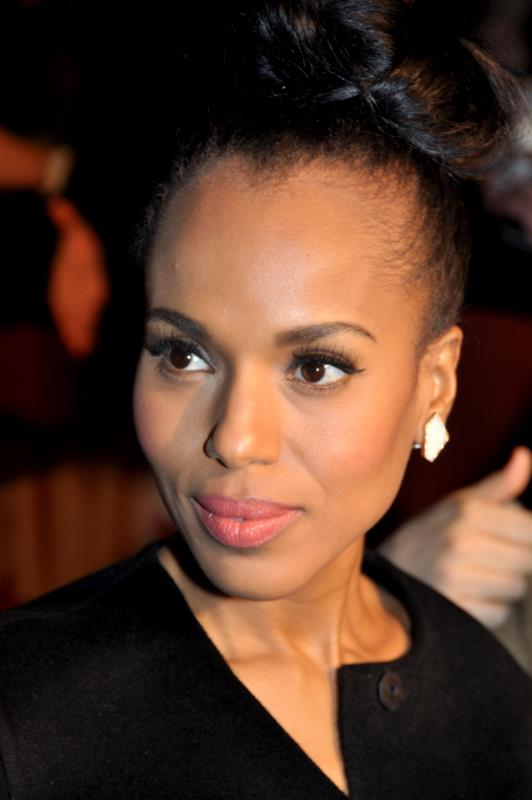
Kerry Washington

- Casey Affleck, actor (did not graduate)
- Angela Aki, singer-songwriter (Final Fantasy XII)
- Nazenin Ansari, Voice of America correspondent
- Emily Axford, actor
- Alec Baldwin, actor (did not graduate)
- William Peter Blatty, writer and filmmaker who wrote the novel The Exorcist (1971) and the subsequent screenplay version, for which he won an Academy Award
- Warren Brown, TV host on the Food Network
- Courteney Cox (Mt. Vernon alumni), actress
- Merce Cunningham (attended), dancer and choreographer
- Manish Dayal, actor, known for 90210
- Donna Dixon, actress, wife of Dan Aykroyd
- Adam Friedland, stand-up comedian, talk-show host and podcaster
- Ina Garten, host of Barefoot Contessa
- Haddaway, singer most famous for "What Is Love" single
- Taylor Hale, winner of Big Brother 24, Miss Michigan USA 2021
- Kevin Peter Hall, actor, Predator
- Haroon, graduate in Business Administration, singer, composer, musician and engineer
- i_o, DJ and record producer
- Reona Ito, music conductor (alumnus of the Elliott School)
- Chris Kilmore, turntablist for the band Incubus
- David Lynch (attended), director
- Rooney Mara (attended), actress, The Girl with the Dragon Tattoo
- Ross Martin, television, film, radio actor; Wild, Wild West
- Eliza McLamb, singer-songwriter and podcast host (did not graduate)
- Dina Merrill, actress and socialite
- T.J. Miller, actor and stand-up comedian, Silicon Valley
- Naeto C, rapper
- Yvonne Orji, actress and comedian
- Lee Phillip, actor
- Neil Portnow, CEO of The Recording Academy and MusiCares; vice-president of the West Coast division of Jive Records and Arista Records
- Adam Richman (attended for one year), indie pop singer-songwriter
- Mark Russell, satirist and comedian
- Sydney Sadick, television personality
- Whitney Sudler-Smith, television personality and socialite
- Van Toffler, president of Viacom Media Networks
- Kerry Washington (1998), actress
- Andrew Weitz, fashion stylist and talent agent
- Bill Westenhofer, Academy Award-winning visual effects artist
- Nathan Hale Williams, film and television producer, entertainment lawyer
- Scott Wolf (1991), actor
- Rachel Zoe, celebrity fashion stylist

== Government ==
=== Central Intelligence ===
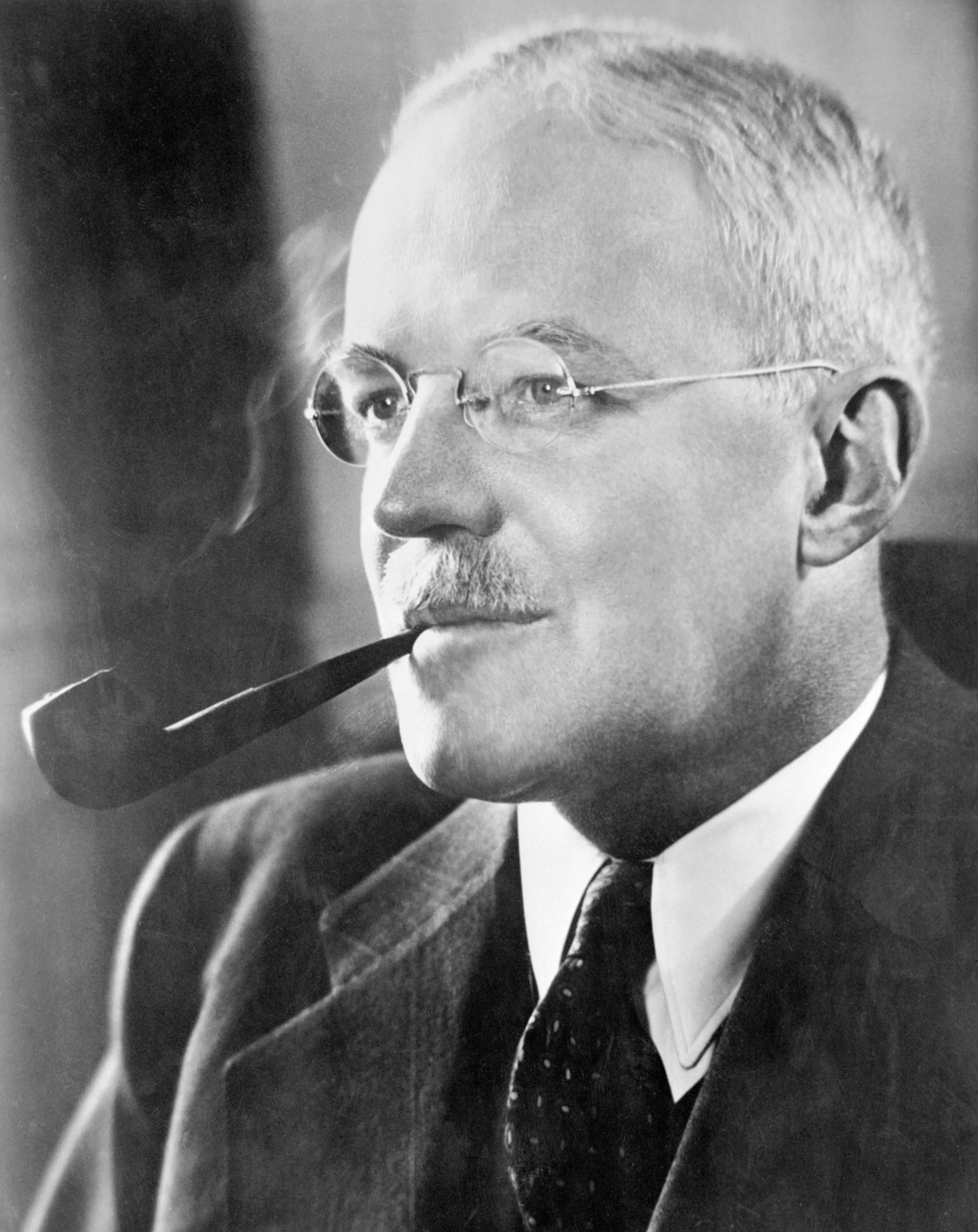
Allen Dulles

- Aldrich Ames, Soviet spy working in the CIA as a counter-intelligence officer
- Andrew P. Bakaj, Department of Defense and CIA official; lead counsel for the whisteblower during the impeachment inquiry and the subsequent impeachment of President Donald Trump
- Harold Brown Jr., CIA officer and U.S. Army Reserve major who was killed during the Camp Chapman attack
- Allen Dulles (1920), 5th Director of Central Intelligence and longest serving CIA director
- John Kiriakou, CIA intelligence analyst
- James W. McCord Jr., CIA officer, involved in the Watergate scandal
- William O. Studeman, 17th Deputy Director of the Central Intelligence Agency and two time acting Director of Central Intelligence; also 12th Director of the National Security Agency and Director of Naval Intelligence; retired U.S. Navy admiral

=== Defense Department ===
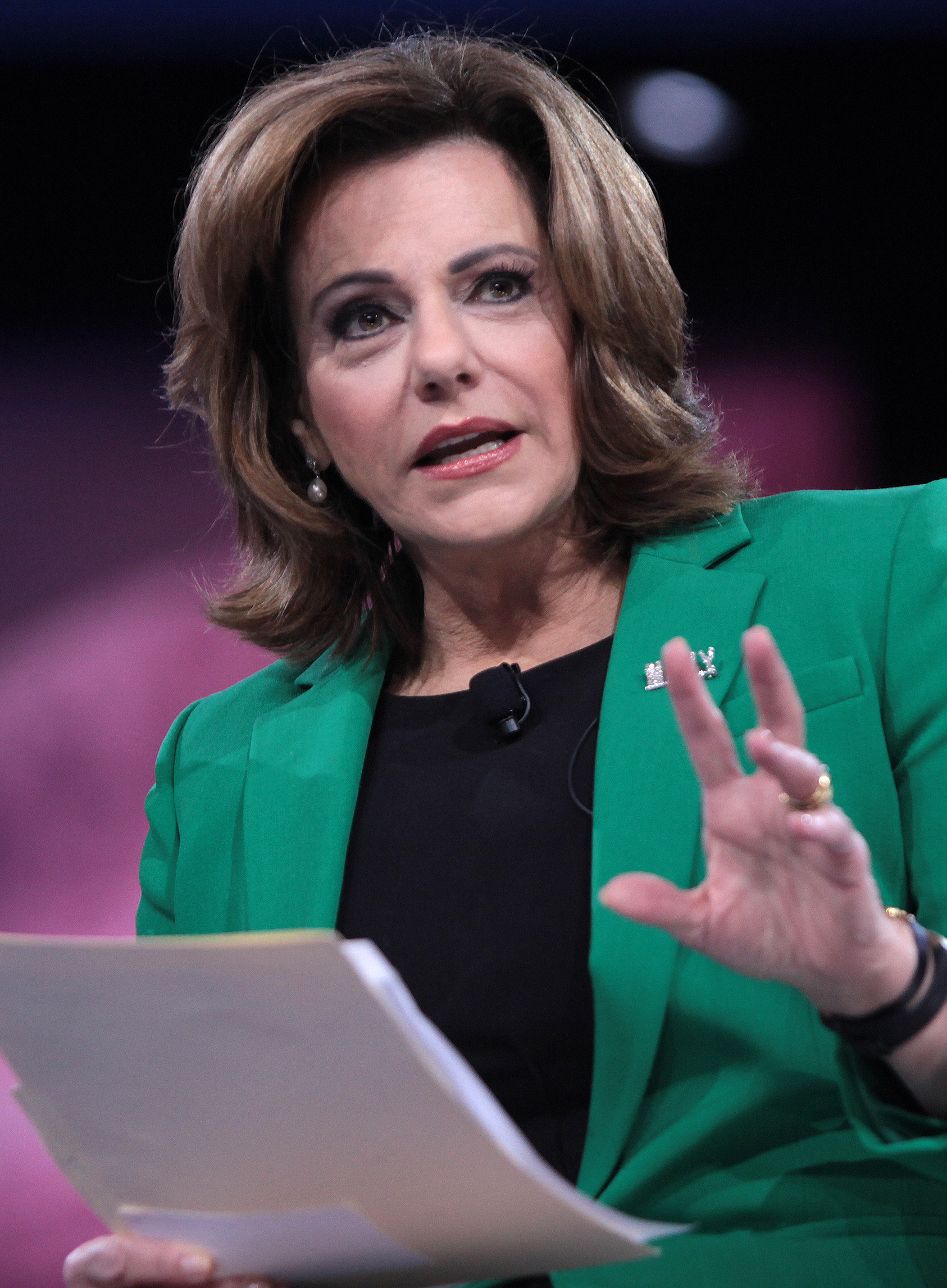
K. T. McFarland

- Dionel M. Aviles, Under Secretary of the Navy, Assistant Secretary of the Navy
- Victoria Clarke, assistant secretary of Defense for Public Affairs
- David O. Cooke, Director of Administration and Management
- Carlos Del Toro, United States Secretary of the Navy
- Robert F. Hale, under secretary of Defense
- Kathleen Troia McFarland, Deputy National Security Advisor and deputy assistant secretary of Defense for Public Affairs
- Dominic J. Monetta, deputy director of Defense Research and Engineering at the U.S. Department of Defense; director, Office of New Production Reactors, at the United States Department of Energy
- B. J. Penn, Assistant Secretary of the Navy
- John P. Roth, assistant secretary of the Air Force
- Robert O. Work, United States Deputy Secretary of Defense

=== Health Department ===
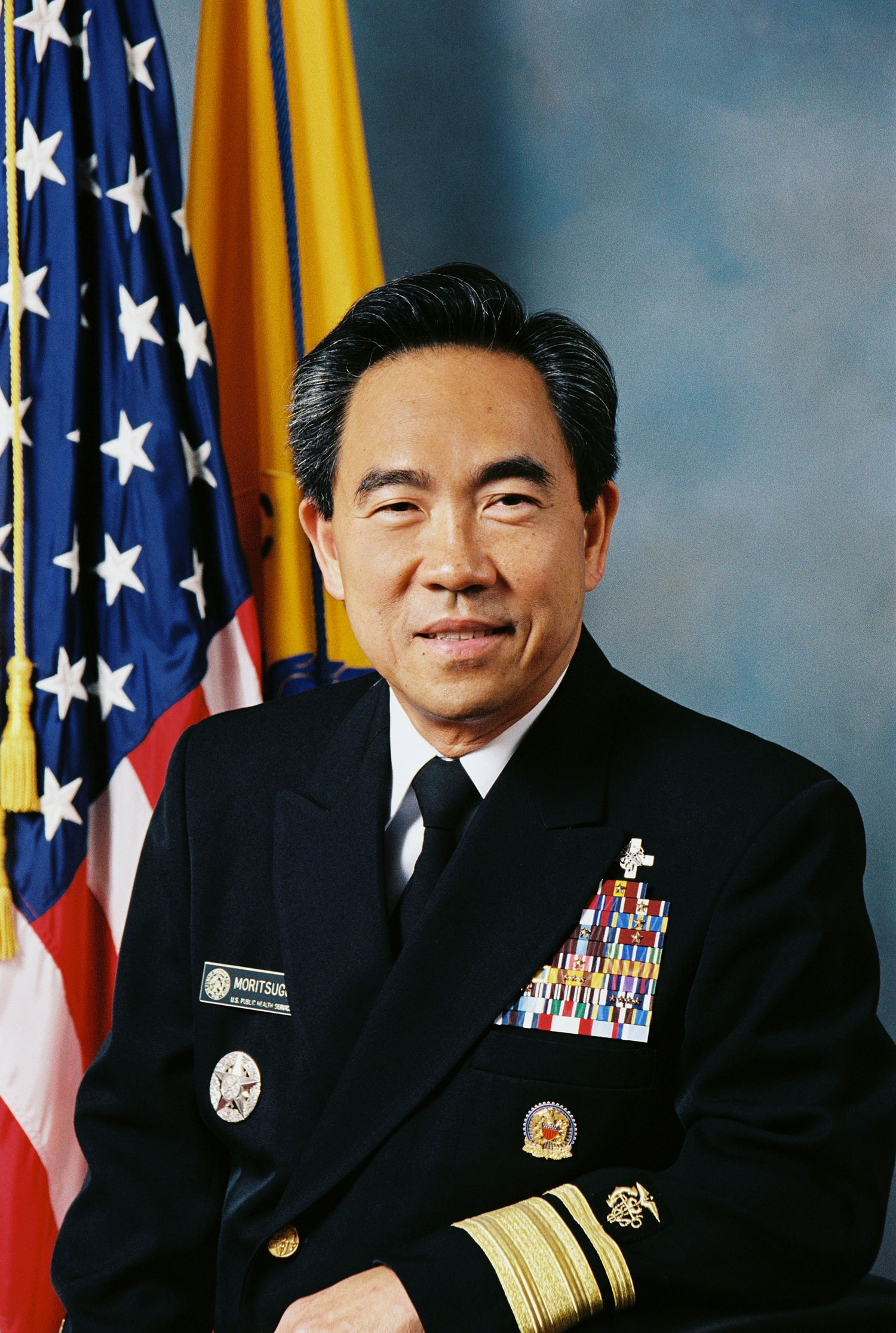
Kenneth P. Moritsugu

- Kenneth P. Moritsugu (M.D. 1971), first Asian American Surgeon General of the United States

=== Justice Department ===
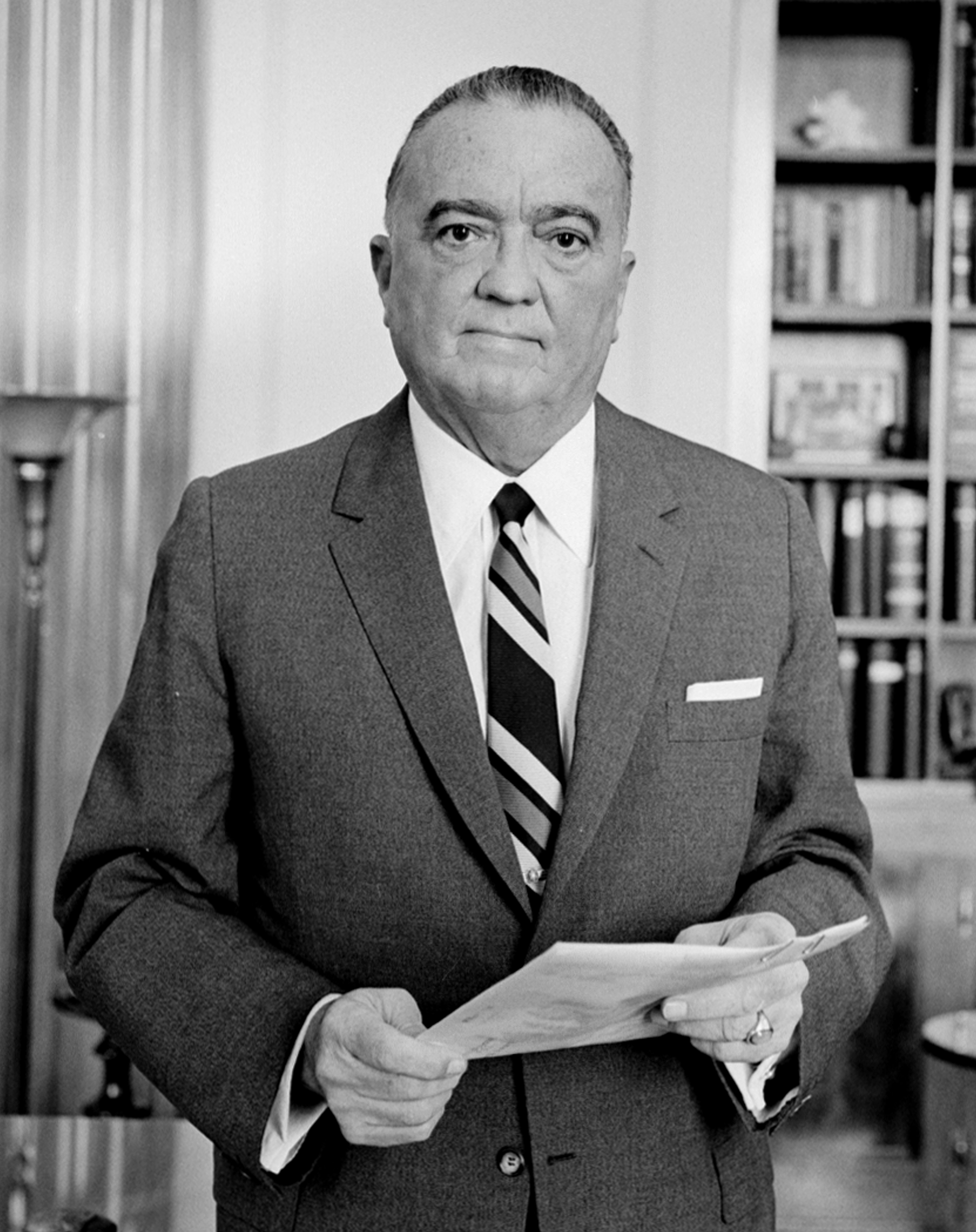
J. Edgar Hoover

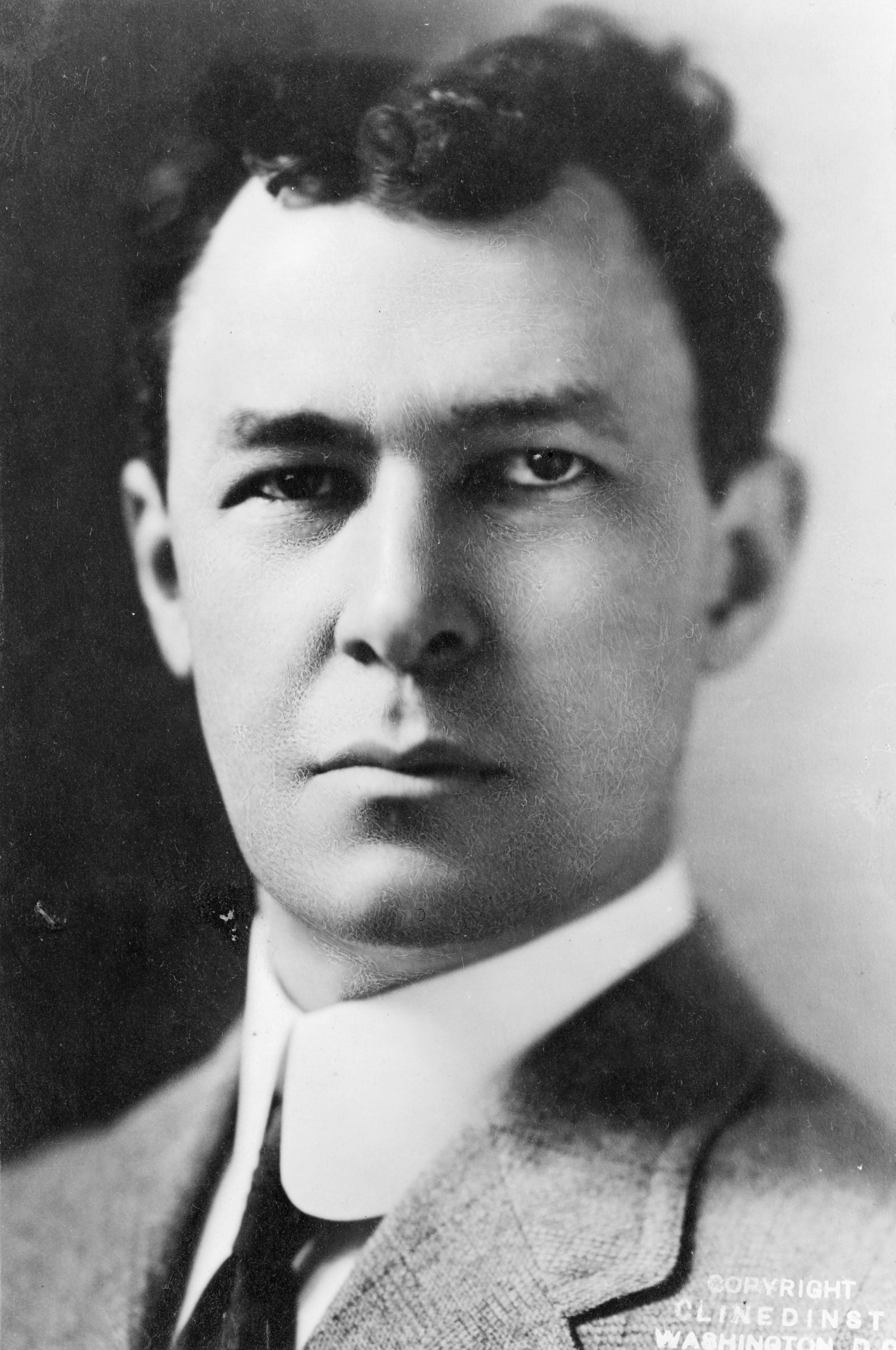
Stanley Finch

- A. Bruce Bielaski, director of the Bureau of Investigation, predecessor to the FBI
- Floyd I. Clarke, director of the FBI
- Sibel Edmonds, FBI translator, founder of the National Security Whistleblowers Coalition
- W. Mark Felt (1940), associate director, FBI; "Deep Throat" informant
- Stanley Finch (JD 1908), first director of the Bureau of Investigation
- L. Patrick Gray, acting director of the FBI during the Watergate scandal
- J. Edgar Hoover (1916, 1917, 1935), first director of the FBI
- Kenneth E. Melson, director of the Bureau of Alcohol, Tobacco, Firearms and Explosives
- Eric O'Neill (JD 2003), FBI agent whose work led to the arrest and life-imprisonment conviction of Robert Hanssen
- John P. O'Neill, assistant director in the FBI; head of security at the World Trade Center; died in the September 11, 2001 attacks
- Clyde Tolson, associate director of the FBI, protégé of FBI director J. Edgar Hoover

=== National security ===
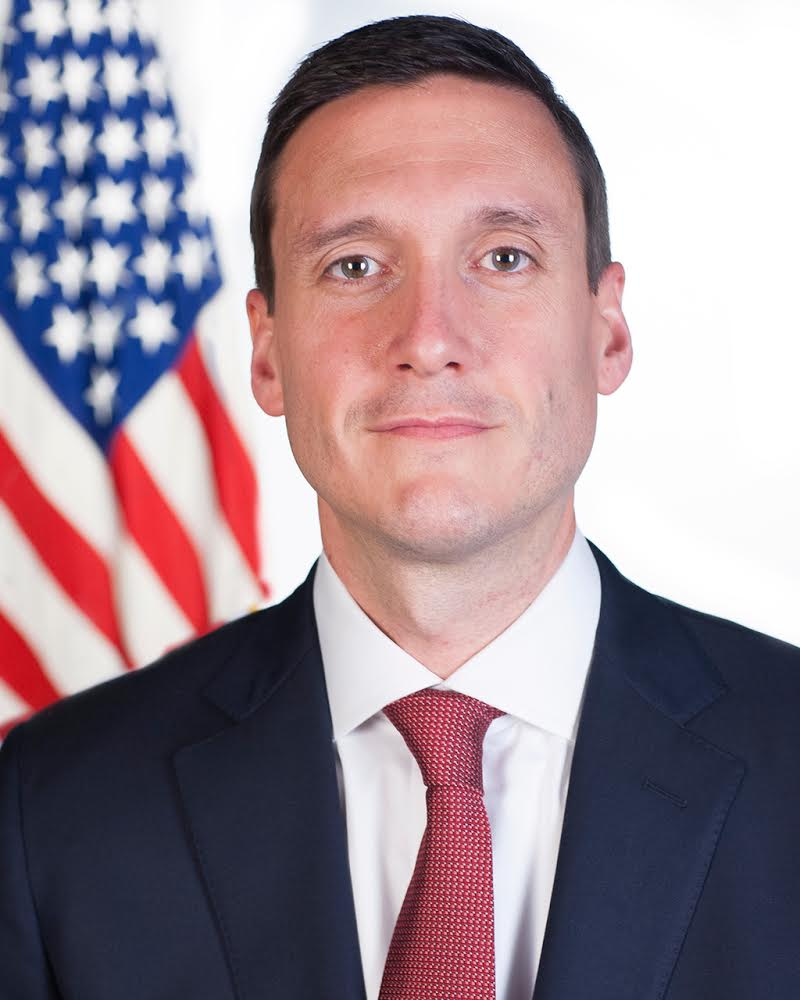
Tom Bossert

- William B. Black Jr., 16th Deputy Director of the National Security Agency
- Tom Bossert, United States Homeland Security Advisor for President Donald Trump
- Roger Cressey, member of the United States National Security Council
- Tim Morrison, member of the United States National Security Council

=== Post Office ===
- Frank Harris Hitchcock, 44th United States Postmaster General
- William Lyne Wilson (BA 1860), 37th United States Postmaster General, U.S. House of Representatives from West Virginia, president of Washington and Lee University

=== State Department officials ===
- William Tapley Bennett Jr., Assistant Secretary of State for Legislative Affairs
- Richard Boucher, Assistant Secretary of State for South and Central Asian Affairs
- Eileen Claussen, Assistant Secretary of State for Oceans and International Environmental and Scientific Affairs
- Randall M. Fort, Assistant Secretary of State for Intelligence and Research
- J. Edward Fox, Assistant Secretary of State for Legislative Affairs
- Michelle Giuda, Assistant Secretary of State for Public Diplomacy and Public Affairs
- Rose Gottemoeller, Assistant Secretary of State for Verification, Compliance, and Implementation
- Grant S. Green, Under Secretary of State for Management
- Brooks Hays, Assistant Secretary of State for Legislative Affairs
- Jacob Helberg, Under Secretary of State for Economic Growth, Energy, and the Environment
- Heather Higginbottom, Deputy Secretary of State for Management and Resources
- John D. Holum, Under Secretary of State for Arms Control and International Security Affairs
- Nelson T. Johnson, Assistant Secretary of State for East Asian and Pacific Affairs
- Julius Katz, Assistant Secretary of State for Economic and Business Affairs
- Carol Laise, Assistant Secretary of State for Public Affairs
- David Marchick, Deputy Assistant Secretary of State for Economic and Business Affairs
- Robert J. McCloskey, Assistant Secretary of State for Legislative Affairs
- Robert Daniel Murphy, Under Secretary of State for Political Affairs and Assistant Secretary of State for International Organization Affairs
- Tibor P. Nagy, Assistant Secretary of State for African Affairs
- Heather Nauert, Under Secretary of State for Public Diplomacy and Public Affairs
- John Peurifoy, Assistant Secretary of State for Administration
- John F. W. Rogers, Under Secretary of State for Management
- Robert M. Sayre, Inspector General of the State Department and Coordinator for Counterterrorism
- Gregory B. Starr, Assistant Secretary of State for Diplomatic Security
- James E. Webb, United States Under Secretary of State
- William Braucher Wood, Assistant Secretary of State for International Organization Affairs

=== Treasury Department ===
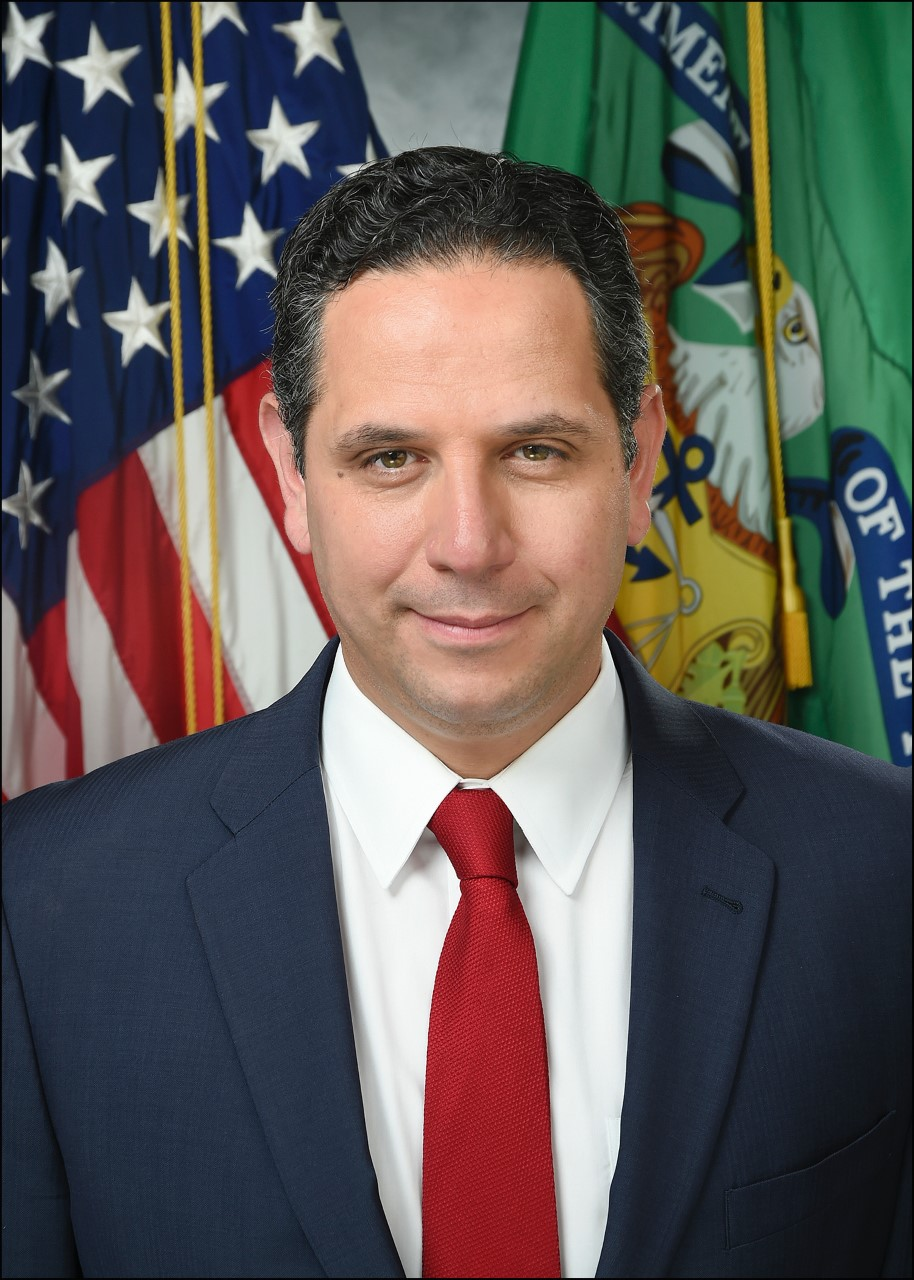
Tony Sayegh

- Robert Nichols, president and COO of the Financial Services Forum, Assistant Secretary of the Treasury for Public Affairs
- Tony Sayegh, U.S. assistant secretary of the Treasury
- James L. Wilmeth, Chief clerk of the United States Department of the Treasury; Director of the Bureau of Engraving and Printing; mayor of Takoma Park, Maryland

=== Other government positions ===
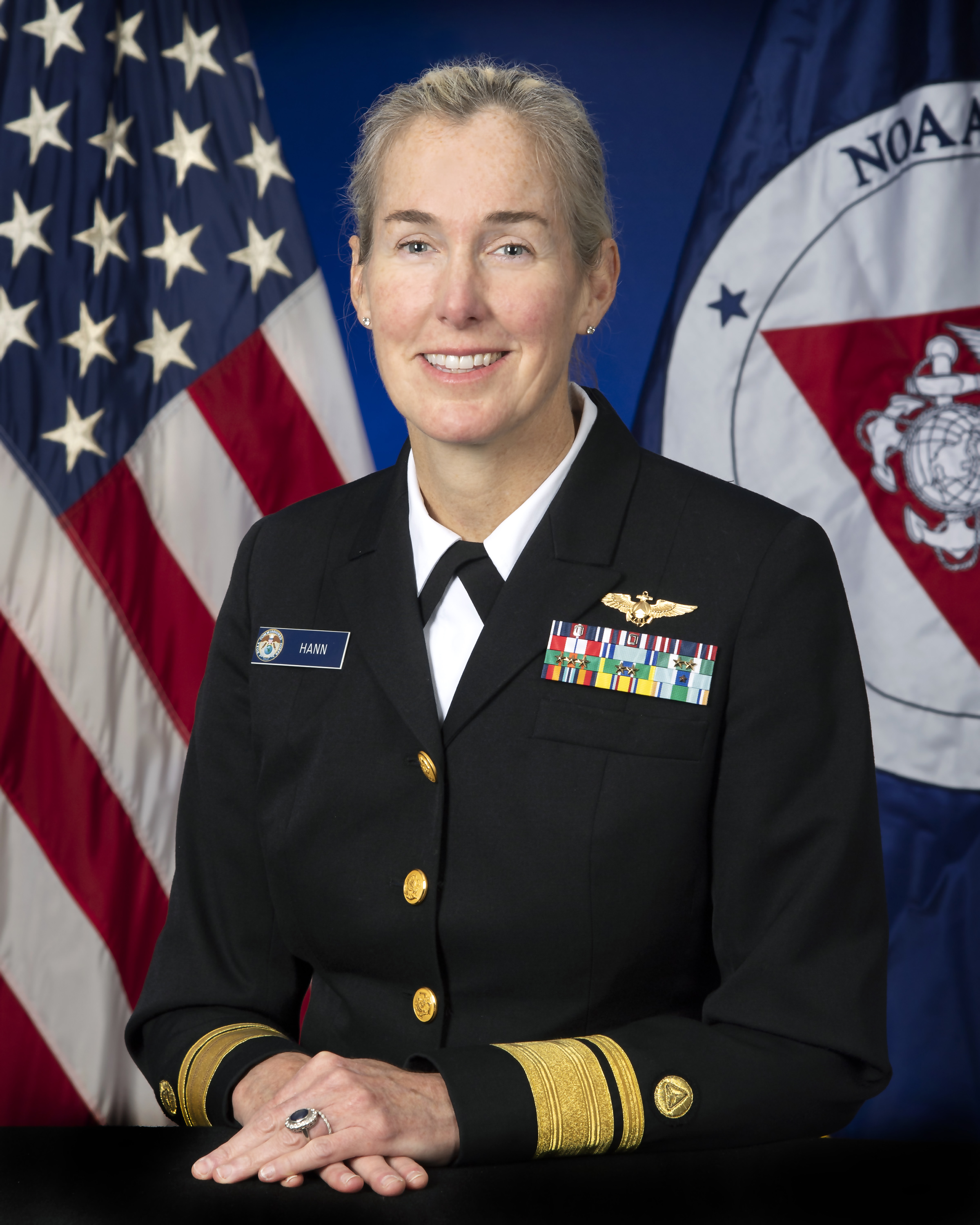
Nancy Hann

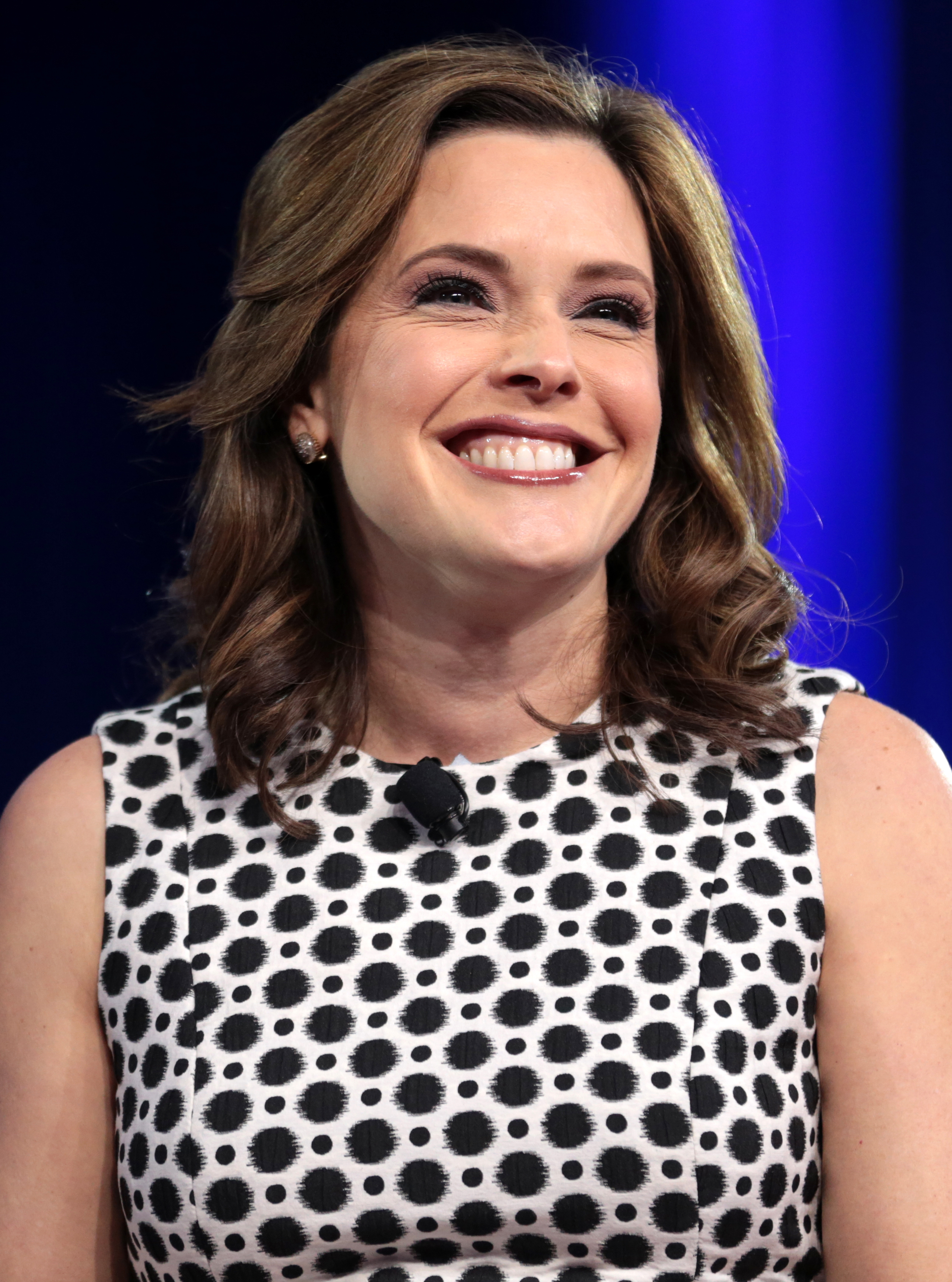
Mercedes Schlapp

- Patricia Wilson Berger, librarian with the National Bureau of Standards, the Institute for Defense Analyses, the United States Patent and Trademark Office, and the Environmental Protection Agency
- Alexander Butterfield, administrator of the Federal Aviation Administration
- Lewis Deschler, first Parliamentarian of the United States House of Representatives
- Cathryn S. Dippo, statistician; associate commissioner of the Office of Survey Methods Research at the Bureau of Labor Statistics
- Nancy Hann, retired U.S. NOAA Corps vice admiral; served as the Deputy Under Secretary for Operations, NOAA
- Kenneth R. Harding (1937), Sergeant at Arms of the United States House of Representatives
- Heather Higginbottom, deputy assistant to the president for Domestic Policy in the administration of Barack Obama
- Rosel H. Hyde, chairman of the Federal Communications Commission
- Diana Josephson, Under Secretary of Commerce for Oceans and Atmosphere
- Gwendolyn King, commissioner of the Social Security Administration
- Raymond Adam Kline, president of National Academy of Public Administration; former deputy and acting administrator of the General Services Administration and associate administrator for management operations at NASA
- Susan Bass Levin, First Deputy Executive Director of the Port Authority of New York and New Jersey; Commissioner of the New Jersey Department of Community Affairs; mayor of Cherry Hill, New Jersey
- Wilma B. Liebman, chair of the National Labor Relations Board
- Dan Maffei, commissioner of the Federal Maritime Commission
- Patrick P. O'Carroll Jr., inspector general of the Social Security Administration
- Maria Pallante (1990), U.S. Register of Copyrights
- Marybeth Peters (1971), U.S. Register of Copyrights
- Margaret Milner Richardson, commissioner of Internal Revenue (or IRS Commissioner), head of the Internal Revenue Service, partner at Ernst & Young
- Catherine M. Russell, chief of staff to Jill Biden, wife of Joseph Biden, associate deputy attorney general
- William Edwin Safford, assistant botanist with the U.S. Department of Agriculture; deputy to the naval governor of Guam
- Mary Schapiro, chairwoman of the U.S. Securities and Exchange Commission, CEO of the Financial Industry Regulatory Authority, chairman and CEO of the National Association of Securities Dealers, chairman of the Commodity Futures Trading Commission, commissioner on the Securities and Exchange Commission, director of Kraft Foods Inc, and Duke Energy Corporation
- Mercedes Schlapp, White House Director of Strategic Communications
- Harry A. Slattery, US under secretary of the Interior, 1938–39; the Slattery Report
- Katie Walsh, White House Deputy Chief of Staff

== Law ==
=== U.S. circuit judges ===
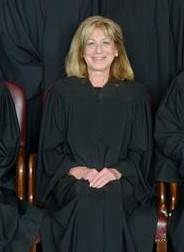
Sharon Prost

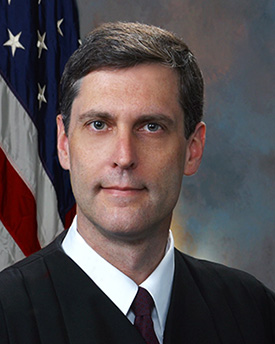
John Michael Seabright

- Glenn L. Archer Jr., chief judge of the U.S. Court of Appeals for the Federal Circuit
- Bennett Champ Clark, judge of the U.S. Court of Appeals for the District of Columbia Circuit
- Richard Dickson Cudahy, senior judge of the U.S. Court of Appeals for the Seventh Circuit
- William Edward Doyle, senior judge of the U.S. Court of Appeals for the Tenth Circuit
- Clyde H. Hamilton, senior judge of the U.S. Court of Appeals for the Fourth Circuit
- David R. Hansen, senior judge of the U.S. Court of Appeals for the Eighth Circuit
- Barbara Milano Keenan, judge of the U.S. Court of Appeals for the Fourth Circuit
- Richard Linn, senior judge of the U.S. Court of Appeals for the Federal Circuit
- Carlos F. Lucero, judge of the U.S. Court of Appeals for the Tenth Circuit
- Sharon Prost, chief judge of the U.S. Court of Appeals for the Federal Circuit
- Randall Ray Rader, chief judge of the U.S. Court of Appeals for the Federal Circuit
- Kenneth Francis Ripple, senior judge of the U.S. Court of Appeals for the Seventh Circuit
- Scott W. Stucky, chief judge of the U.S. Court of Appeals for the Armed Forces
- Albert Tate Jr., judge of the U.S. Court of Appeals for the Fifth Circuit
- Robert Smith Vance, judge of the U.S. Court of Appeals for the Eleventh Circuit

=== U.S. district judges ===
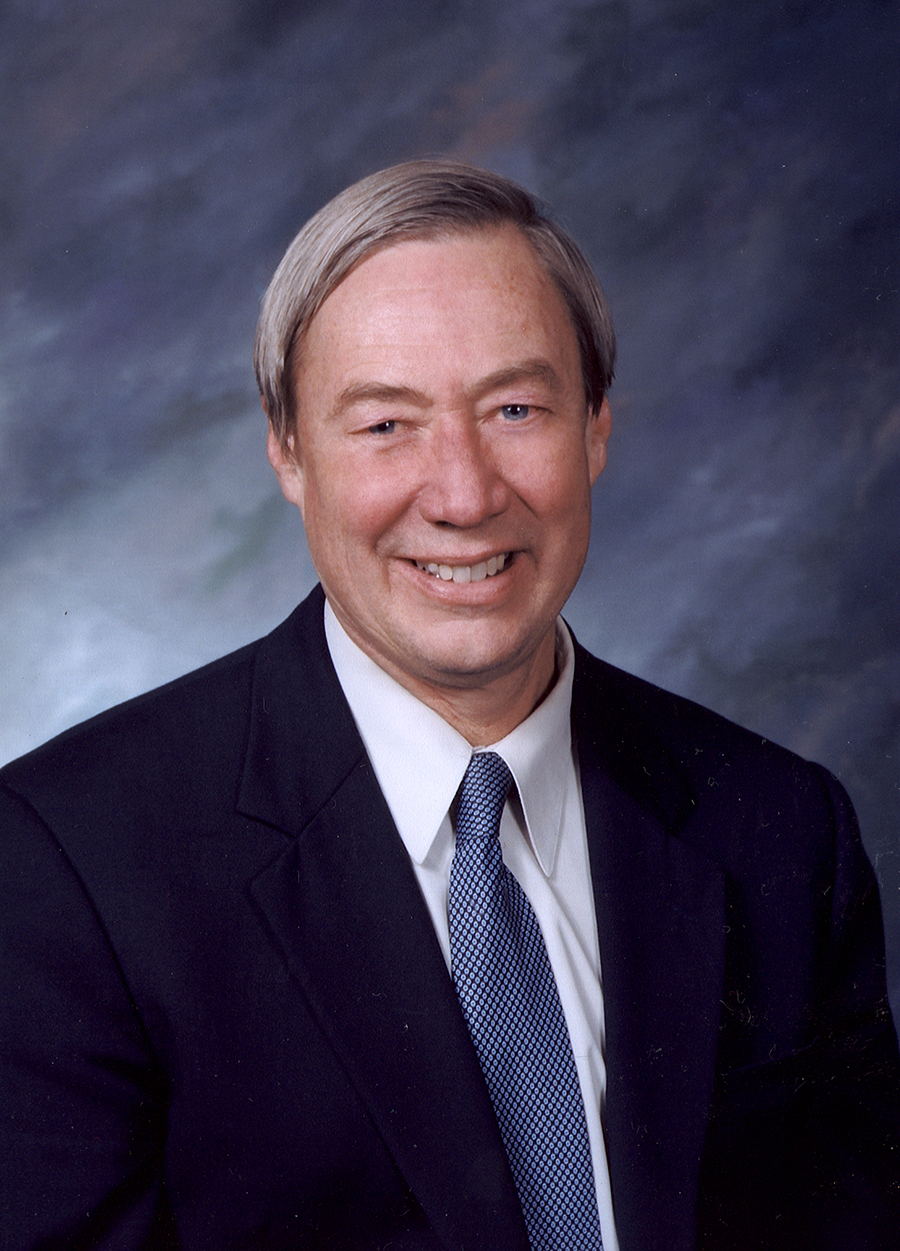
William K. Sessions III

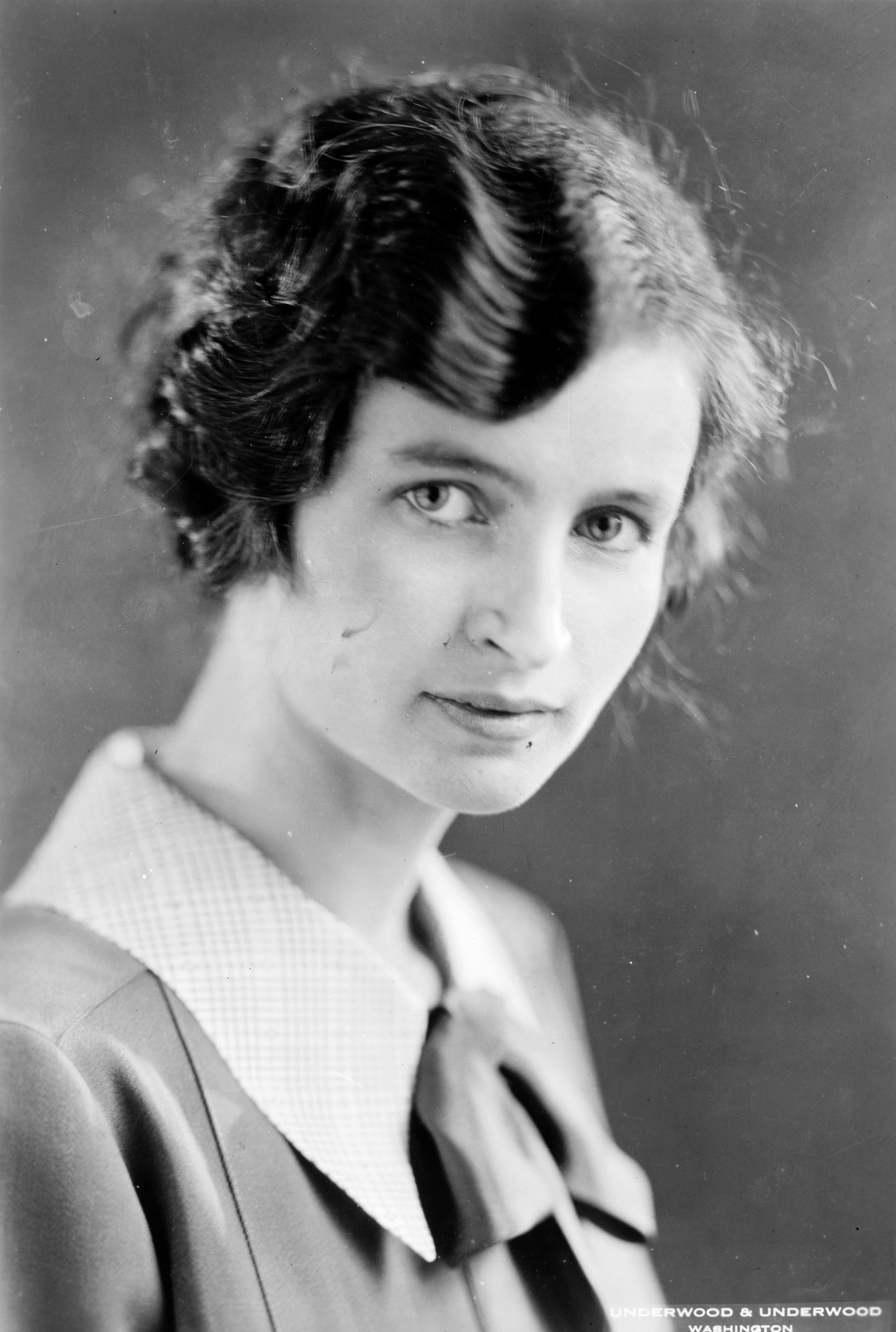
Burnita Shelton Matthews

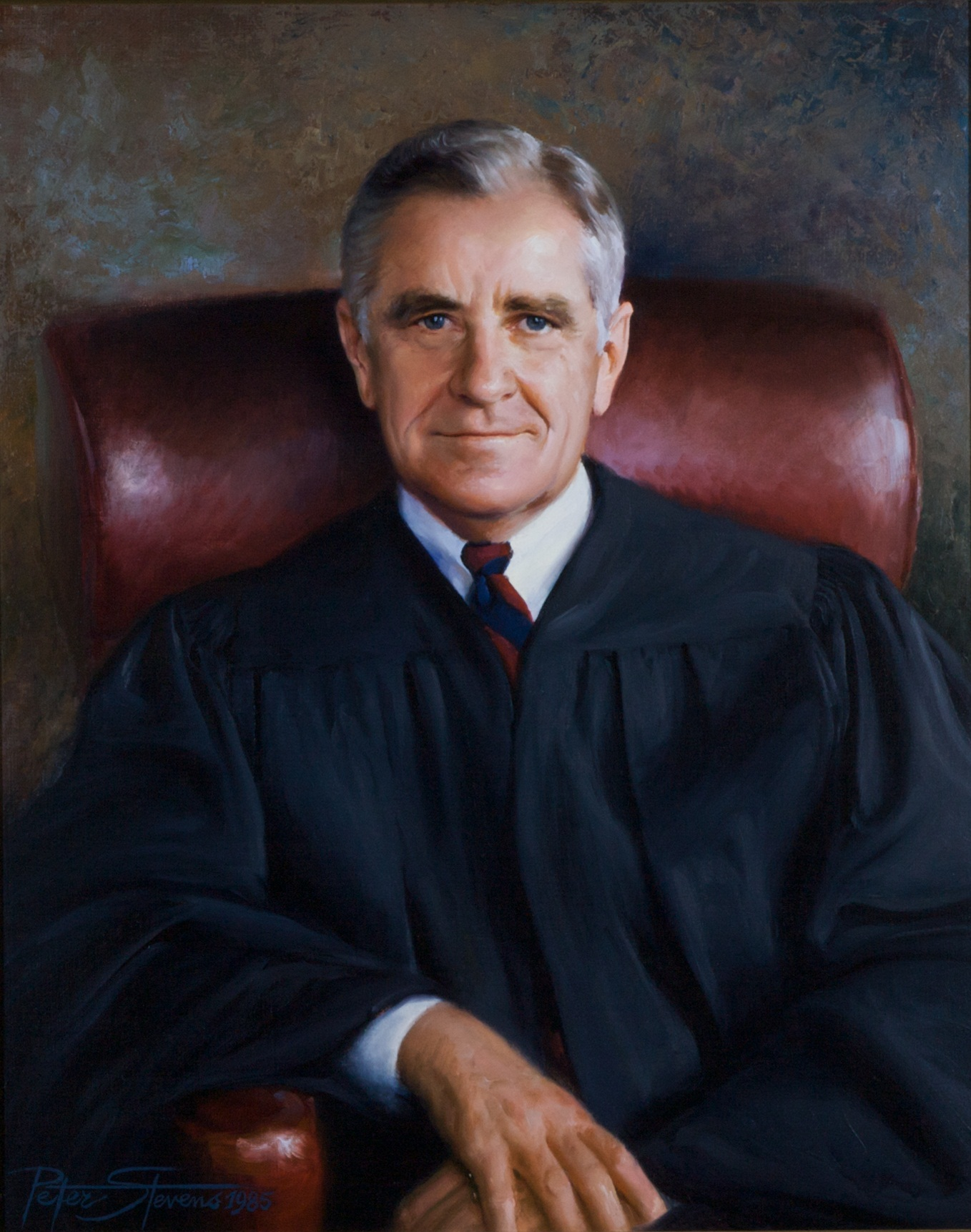
Harry L. Carrico

- Jorge Luis Alonso, judge of the U.S. District Court for the Northern District of Illinois
- G. Ross Anderson, senior judge of the U.S. District Court for the District of South Carolina
- James F. Battin, chief judge of the U.S. District Court for the District of Montana; U.S. House of Representatives from Montana
- Paul Benson, senior judge of the U.S. District Court for the District of North Dakota
- Andrew Coyle Bradley, judge of the U.S. District Court for the District of Columbia
- James C. Cacheris, chief judge of the U.S. District Court for the Eastern District of Virginia
- Albert Sherman Christensen, senior judge of the U.S. District Court for the District of Utah
- Tanya S. Chutkan, judge of the U.S. District Court for the District of Columbia
- Cameron McGowan Currie, senior judge of the U.S. District Court for the District of South Carolina
- Arthur Marshall Davis, judge of the U.S. District Court for the District of Arizona
- William Edward Doyle, judge of the U.S. District Court for the District of Colorado
- Catherine Eagles, judge of the U.S. District Court for the Middle District of North Carolina
- Darrin P. Gayles, judge of the U.S. District Court for the District of Florida
- Joyce Hens Green, senior judge of the U.S. District Court for the District of Columbia
- Harold H. Greene, senior judge of the U.S. District Court for the District of Columbia
- Tom Greenwell, first Republican judge of the 319th District Court in Corpus Christi
- Clyde H. Hamilton, judge of the U.S. District Court for the District of South Carolina
- David R. Hansen, judge of the U.S. District Court for the Northern District of Iowa
- Adolph A. Hoehling Jr., judge of the U.S. District Court for the District of Columbia
- Sarah T. Hughes, senior judge of the U.S. District Court for the Northern District of Texas
- Roger L. Hunt, senior judge of the U.S. District Court for the District of Nevada
- Edwin F. Hunter, chief judge of the U.S. District Court for the Western District of Louisiana
- Daniel T. K. Hurley, senior judge of the U.S. District Court for the Southern District of Florida
- Benjamin Franklin Keller, judge of the U.S. District Court for the Southern District of West Virginia
- John Milton Killits, senior judge of the U.S. District Court for the Northern District of Ohio
- James Robert Kirkland, judge of the U.S. District Court for the District of Columbia
- Oren Ritter Lewis, senior judge of the U.S. District Court for the Eastern District of Virginia
- Burnita Shelton Matthews, senior judge of the U.S. District Court for the District of Columbia
- Ronald Edward Meredith, chief judge of the U.S. District Court for the Western District of Kentucky
- William Matthews Merrick, judge of the U.S. District Court for the District of Columbia
- Suzanne Mitchell, magistrate judge of the U.S. District Court for the Western District of Oklahoma
- Edward Skottowe Northrop, chief judge of the U.S. District Court for the District of Maryland
- Linda Vivienne Parker, judge of the U.S. District Court for the Eastern District of Michigan
- Gordon Jay Quist, senior judge of the U.S. District Court for the Western District of Michigan
- James Robertson, senior judge of the U.S. District Court for the District of Columbia
- Gerald Ellis Rosen, chief judge of the U.S. District Court for the Eastern District of Michigan
- Albert Morris Sames, senior judge of the U.S. District Court for the District of Arizona
- Henry Albert Schweinhaut, senior judge of the U.S. District Court for the District of Columbia
- John Michael Seabright, chief judge of the U.S. District Court for the District of Hawaii
- William K. Sessions III, senior judge of the U,S, District Court for the District of Vermont; chair of the U.S. Sentencing Commission
- Frederick Lincoln Siddons, judge of the U.S. District Court for the District of Columbia
- Alfred Adams Wheat, chief judge of the U.S. District Court for the District of Columbia
- Stephen Victor Wilson, judge of the U.S. District Court for the Central District of California

=== Other U.S. federal judges ===
- Joyce Hens Green, presiding judge of the U.S. Foreign Intelligence Surveillance Court
- Thomas F. Hogan, presiding judge of the U.S. Foreign Intelligence Surveillance Court
- William Barberie Howell, chief judge of the U.S. Customs Court
- Chester Sipkin, administrative law judge for the United States Department of Justice Immigration and Naturalization Service

=== U.S. state supreme courts ===
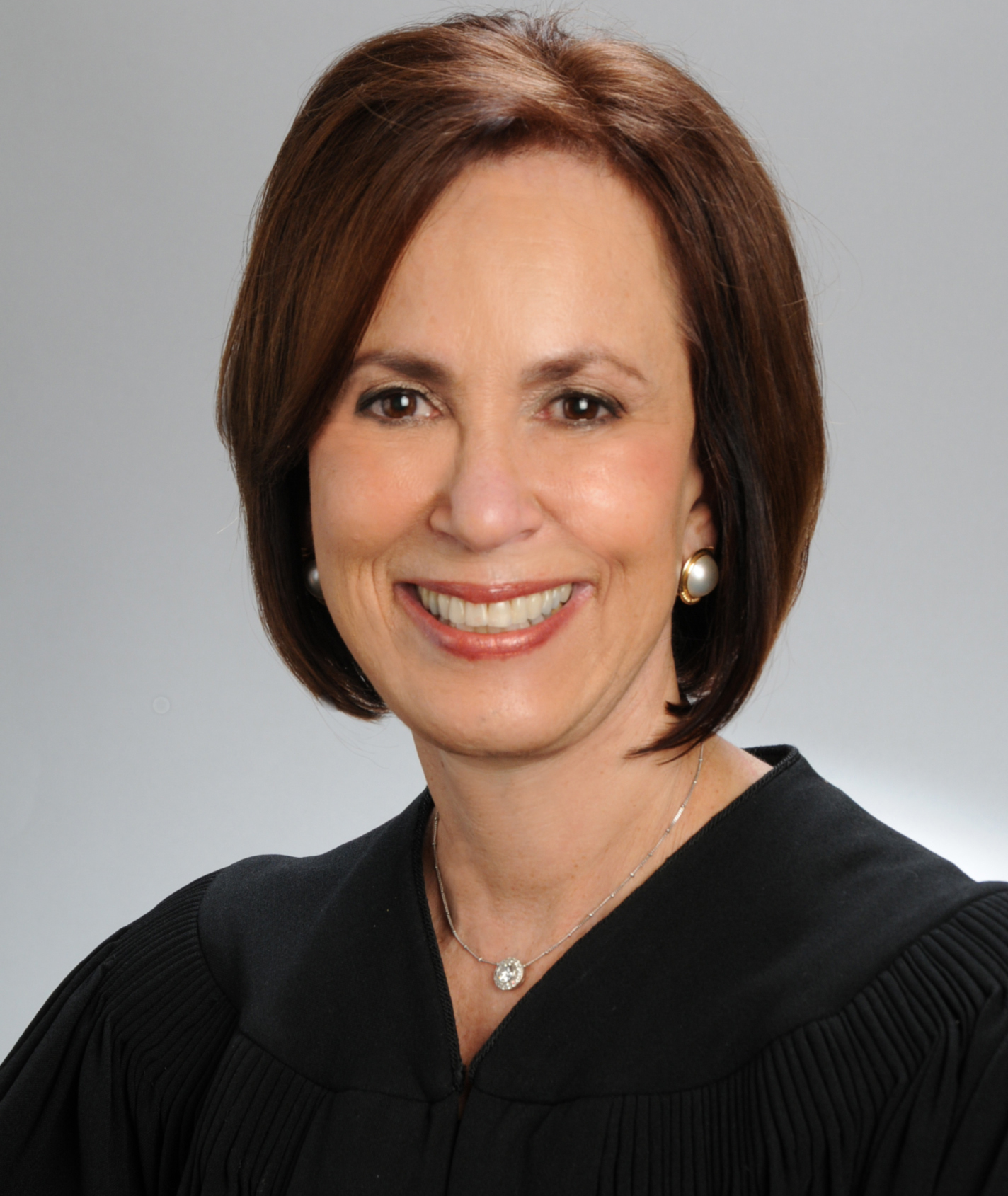
Barbara Pariente

- Russell A. Anderson, 20th chief justice of the Minnesota Supreme Court
- Harry L. Carrico, 23rd chief justice of the Virginia Supreme Court
- A. Lee Chandler, 28th chief justice of the South Carolina Supreme Court
- William D. Cohen, associate justice of the Vermont Supreme Court
- Mary S. Coleman, 57th chief justice of the Michigan Supreme Court
- Félix Córdova Dávila, justice of the Puerto Rico Supreme Court
- Rankin Gibson, justice of the Ohio Supreme Court
- Barbara Milano Keenan, justice on the Virginia Supreme Court
- Michael Kruse, chief justice of the American Samoa High Court
- William C. Mims, Justice of the Supreme Court of Virginia, Attorney General of Virginia, Virginia Senate, Virginia House of Delegates
- Barbara Pariente, 51st chief justice of the Florida Supreme Court
- Taylor Hudnall Stukes, 20th chief justice of the South Carolina Supreme Court
- Albert Tate Jr., justice of the Louisiana Supreme Court
- Clifford Taylor, 66th chief justice of the Michigan Supreme Court
- Kathryn Werdegar, justice of the Supreme Court of California
- Horace W. Wilkie, 19th chief justice of the Wisconsin Supreme Court
- D. Frank Wilkins, justice of the Utah Supreme Court
- Adolph Grant Wolf, justice of the Puerto Rico Supreme Court

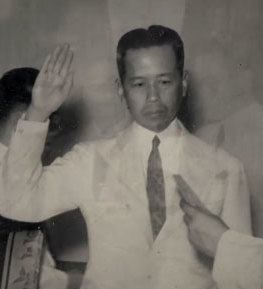
José Abad Santos

=== International judges ===
- Hsu Mo, founding judge of the International Court of Justice
- Mohan Peiris, de facto chief justice of the Supreme Court of Sri Lanka
- José Abad Santos, 5th chief justice of the Supreme Court of the Philippines
- Tshering Wangchuk, chief justice of the Supreme Court of Bhutan

=== Attorneys general ===
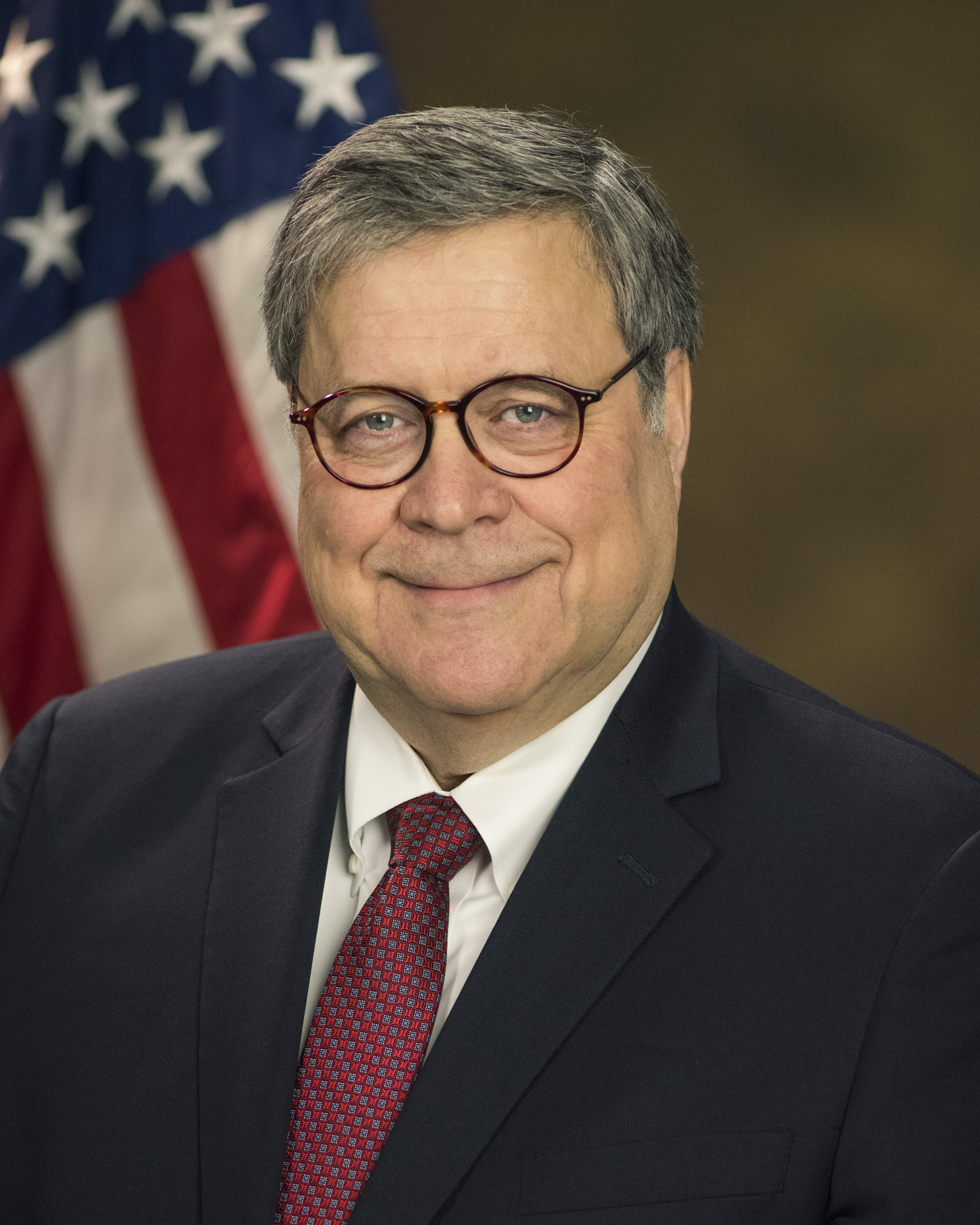
William Barr

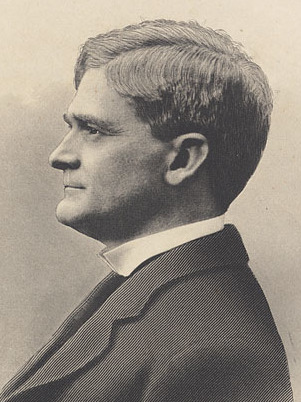
John Garland Pollard

- Paul Benson, North Dakota Attorney General
- Winston Bryant, Arkansas Attorney General
- John A. Carver Jr., Attorney General of American Samoa
- Winston Bryant, Arkansas Attorney General
- Frank Willey Clancy, New Mexico Attorney General, mayor of Albuquerque
- Jack Conway, 49th attorney general of Kentucky
- Frankie Sue Del Papa, 29th attorney general of Nevada
- Makan Delrahim, United States Assistant Attorney General for the Antitrust Division
- M. Jerome Diamond, 22nd attorney general of Vermont
- Rufus L. Edmisten, 46th attorney general of North Carolina
- Aaron Ford, attorney general of Nevada
- Joseph Foster, 29th attorney general of New Hampshire
- JB McCuskey, Attorney General of West Virginia, West Virginia State Auditor, West Virginia House of Delegates
- Bill Mims, 45th attorney general of Virginia
- Kevin J. O'Connor, U.S. associate attorney general
- A. Mitchell Palmer, United States Attorney General
- Mohan Peiris, 41st attorney general of Sri Lanka
- Jeffrey B. Pine, 70th attorney general of Rhode Island
- John Garland Pollard, 21st attorney general of Virginia
- Vernon B. Romney, 14th attorney general of Utah
- Grace Berg Schaible, 20th attorney general of Alaska
- Robert Y. Thornton, 8th attorney general of Oregon
- William C. Wantland, attorney general of the Seminole Nation

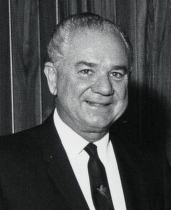
Leon Jaworski

=== Solicitor Generals ===
- Gregory G. Garre, United States Solicitor General
- Ken Starr (1968), United States Solicitor General, and independent counsel during the Whitewater and Monica Lewinsky scandals

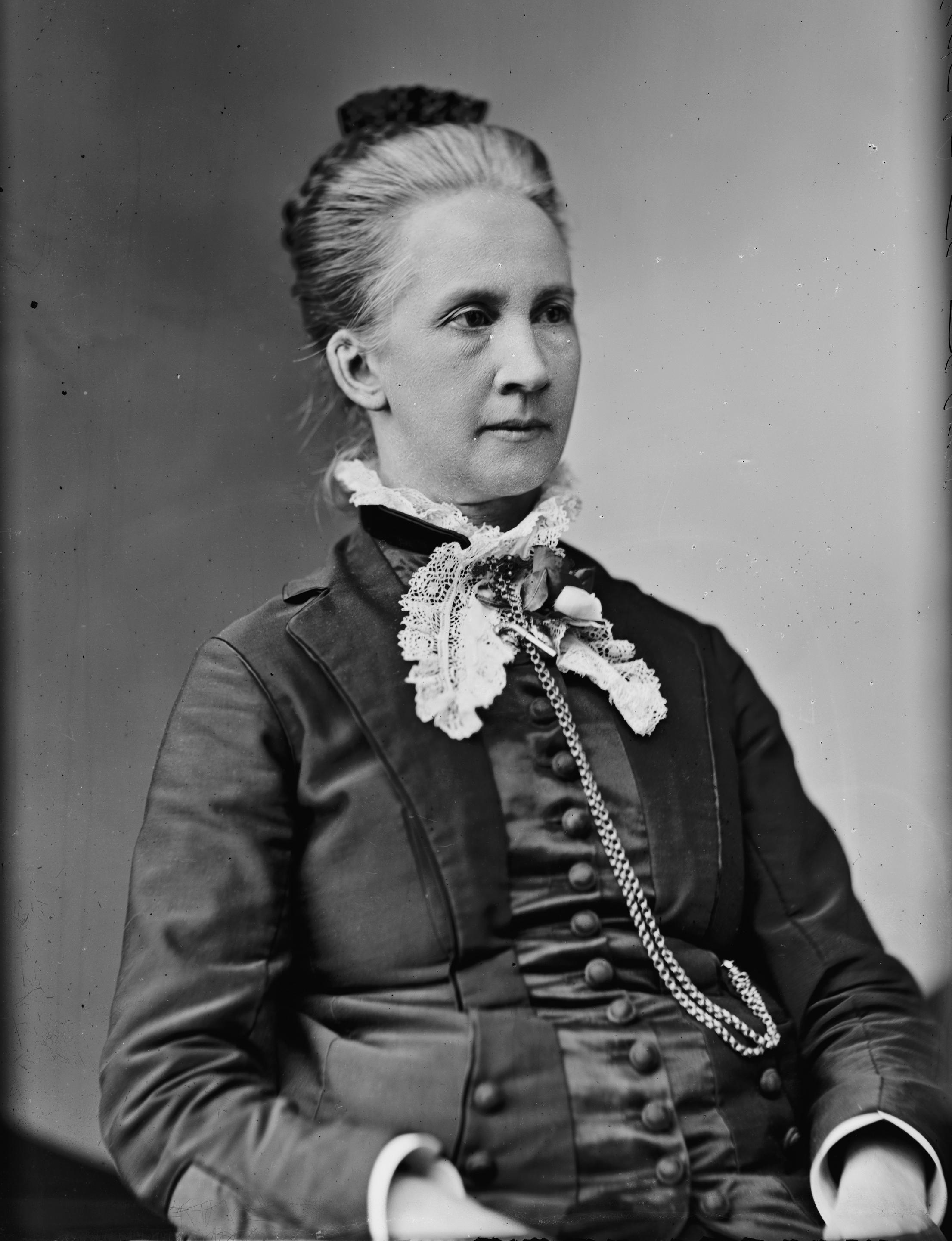
Belva Ann Lockwood

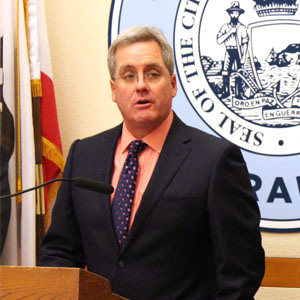
Dennis Herrera

=== Lawyers ===
- Omar Ashmawy, chief counsel to the Office of Congressional Ethics
- Jacob Burns (1924), corporate attorney
- Charles Colson, chief counsel for US President Richard Nixon, spent time in prison for his part in the Watergate scandal
- Harry S. Dent Sr. (JD, 1957), special counsel to President Richard Nixon; general counsel to the Republican National Committee
- Dennis Herrera, city attorney of San Francisco
- Leon Jaworski, special prosecutor during the Watergate scandal
- Charles James, general counsel of Chevron-Texaco
- Belva Ann Lockwood, first woman to argue before the U.S. Supreme Court, first female presidential candidate
- John A. Rizzo, acting general counsel of the CIA
- Bradley Schlozman, United States Attorney for the Western District of Missouri; head of the United States Department of Justice Civil Rights Division
- Flora Warren Seymour, lawyer and first woman member of the Board of Indian Commissioners
- Ira Sorkin, lead attorney for Bernard Madoff
- Delbert Spurlock, General Counsel of the Army
- Harry Aubrey Toulmin Sr. (1882), patent attorney to the Wright Brothers

== Literature and journalism ==
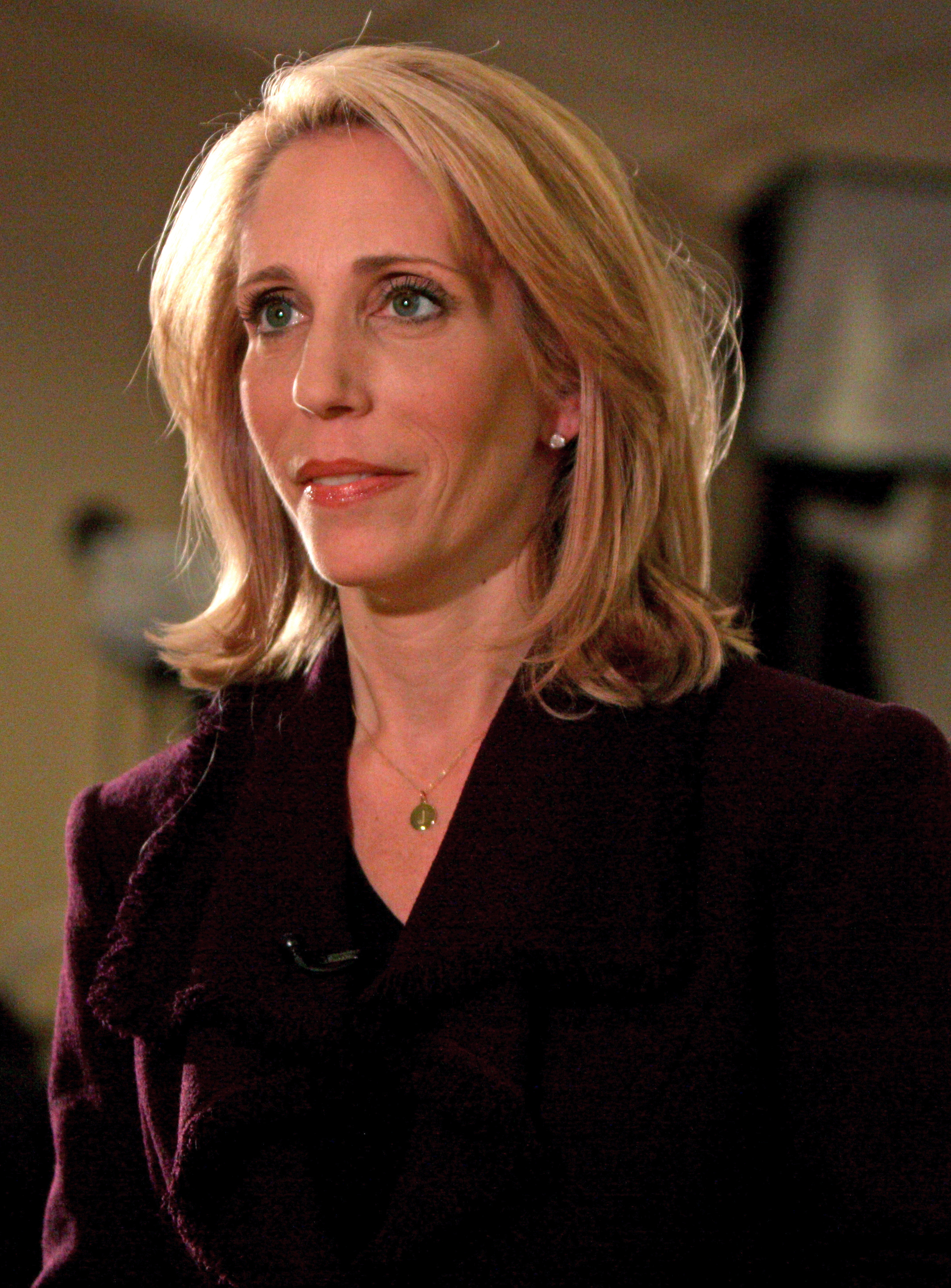
Dana Bash

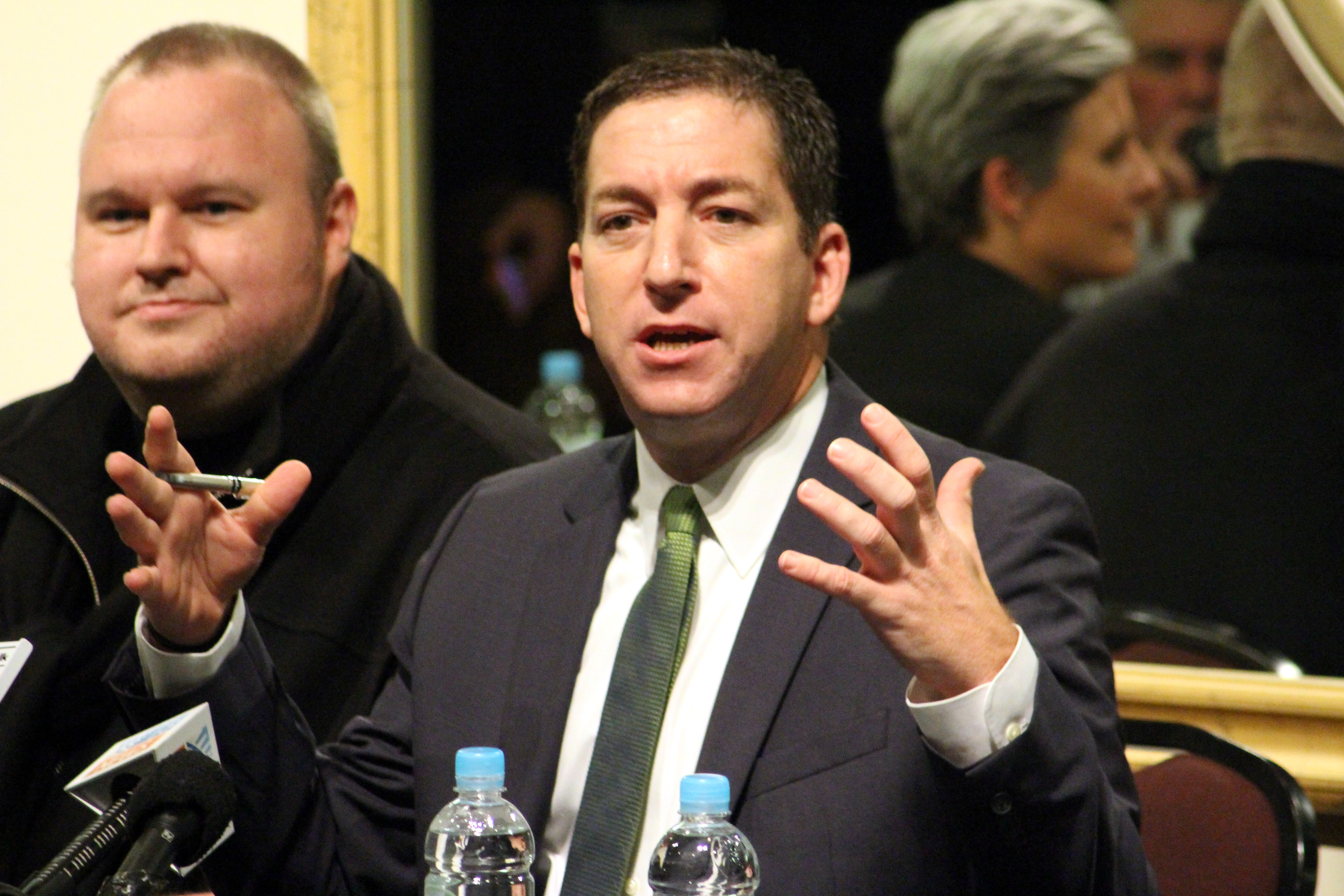
Glenn Greenwald

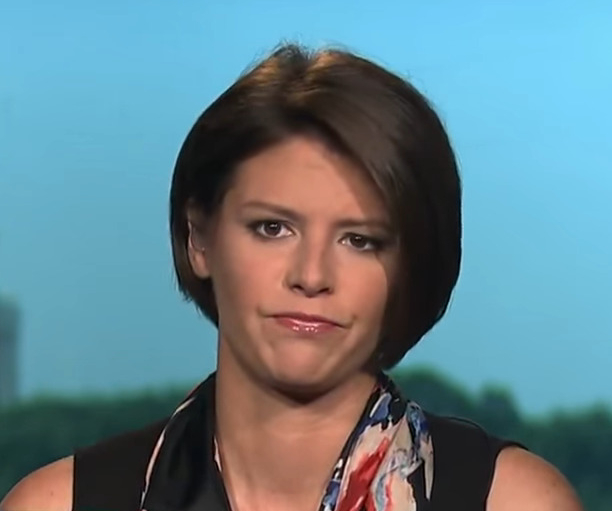
Kasie Hunt

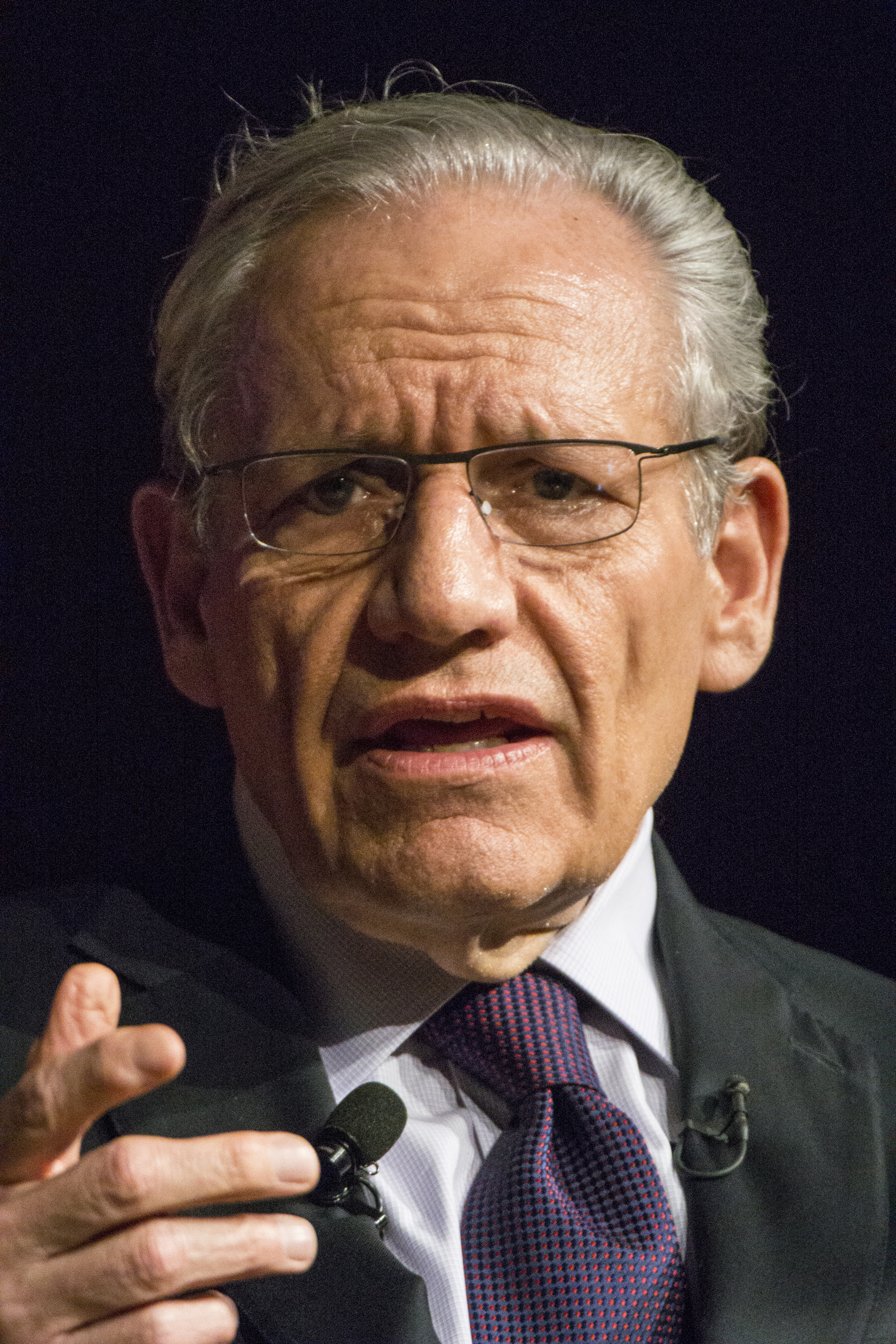
Bob Woodward

- Kat Abughazaleh (2020), journalist and producer of Media Matters for America
- Claribel Alegría, poet and writer
- Chris Anderson, editor-in-chief of Wired
- Dana Bash, CNN anchor, host of Inside Politics and co-anchor of State of the Union
- Steve Benen, lead blogger of The Washington Monthly
- George D. Beveridge, winner of the 1957 Pulitzer Prize for Local Reporting
- Kate Bolduan, CNN correspondent
- John Calder Brennan (Law, 1937), historian and newspaper columnist
- Margaret Carlson, journalist; columnist for Bloomberg News; first woman columnist at Time
- Mona Charen, political analyst and best-selling author
- Bob Considine, journalist with United Press International and author
- Lester del Rey, author, founded Del Rey Books
- David Eisenhower, author and television host
- Nicholas Eftimiades, novelist
- Rowland Evans (1951), news commentator from CNN's Evans, Novak, Hunt and Shields
- Reuben Fink, journalist and author
- Isaac Fitzgerald, writer
- Darwin J. Flakoll, journalist, writer, and translator
- Bill Gertz, reporter and analyst for The Washington Times and Fox News
- Hadas Gold, media and business reporter for CNN and CNN International
- Emily Green, Pulitzer Prize for Audio Reporting in 2020 for her work with This American Life concerning the personal impact of the "Remain in Mexico" policy
- Glenn Greenwald, legal author, columnist at Salon, and winner of the 2014 Pulitzer Prize for Public Service
- Diana B. Henriques, financial jourwnalist with The New York Times; winner of the 2002 Pulitzer Prize for Public Service
- Kasie Hunt, host of MSNBC's Kasie DC
- Jeff Jacoby, columnist for The Boston Globe
- Matt Katz, reporter for WNYC and New Jersey Public Radio
- Michael Kinsley, political commentator and co-host of CNN's Crossfire
- Philip Klein, executive editor of the Washington Examiner
- Sally Kohn, CNN and Fox News commentator
- William McPherson, writer, winner of the 1973 Pulitzer Prize for Criticism
- Thomas McInerney, Fox News pundit
- Doug McKelway, Fox News journalist
- Marianne Means, journalist and syndicated political columnist
- Michael Moran, author of The Reckoning; producer of the documentary series Crisis Guides
- Reena Ninan, CNN correspondent, news anchor
- Mark Olshaker, author and collaborator with John E. Douglas in books regarding criminal and investigative psychology
- Michael Punke, novelist best known for The Revenant
- Josh Rogin, CNN political analyst
- Hilary Rosen, political director and Washington editor at large for The Huffington Post; CEO of the RIAA
- Annika Sharma, author
- Glenn R. Simpson, journalist for Wall Street Journal
- Leah Soibel, executive director of Fuente Latina
- Deborah Solomon, biographer, writer for The New York Times, winner of the 2002 Pulitzer Prize for Explanatory Reporting
- Bhaskar Sunkara, founding editor and publisher of Jacobin
- Ginger Thompson, senior reporter at ProPublica and winner of the 2001 Pulitzer Prize for National Reporting
- Chuck Todd (1991), NBC News political director
- Clay Travis, sports columnist and author
- Geovanny Vicente, CNN columnist and political strategist
- Geovanny Vicente, political strategist and columnist for CNN
- Murray Waas, award-winning journalist and author, The New Yorker, The Los Angeles Times, The Nation, The Village Voice, The National Journal, and The Boston Globe
- Brian Williams, NBC Nightly News anchor
- Bob Woodward, editor at The Washington Post, noted for reporting on the Watergate scandal; winner of the 2002 Pulitzer Prize for National Reporting and the 1973 Pulitzer Prize for Public Service

== Military ==
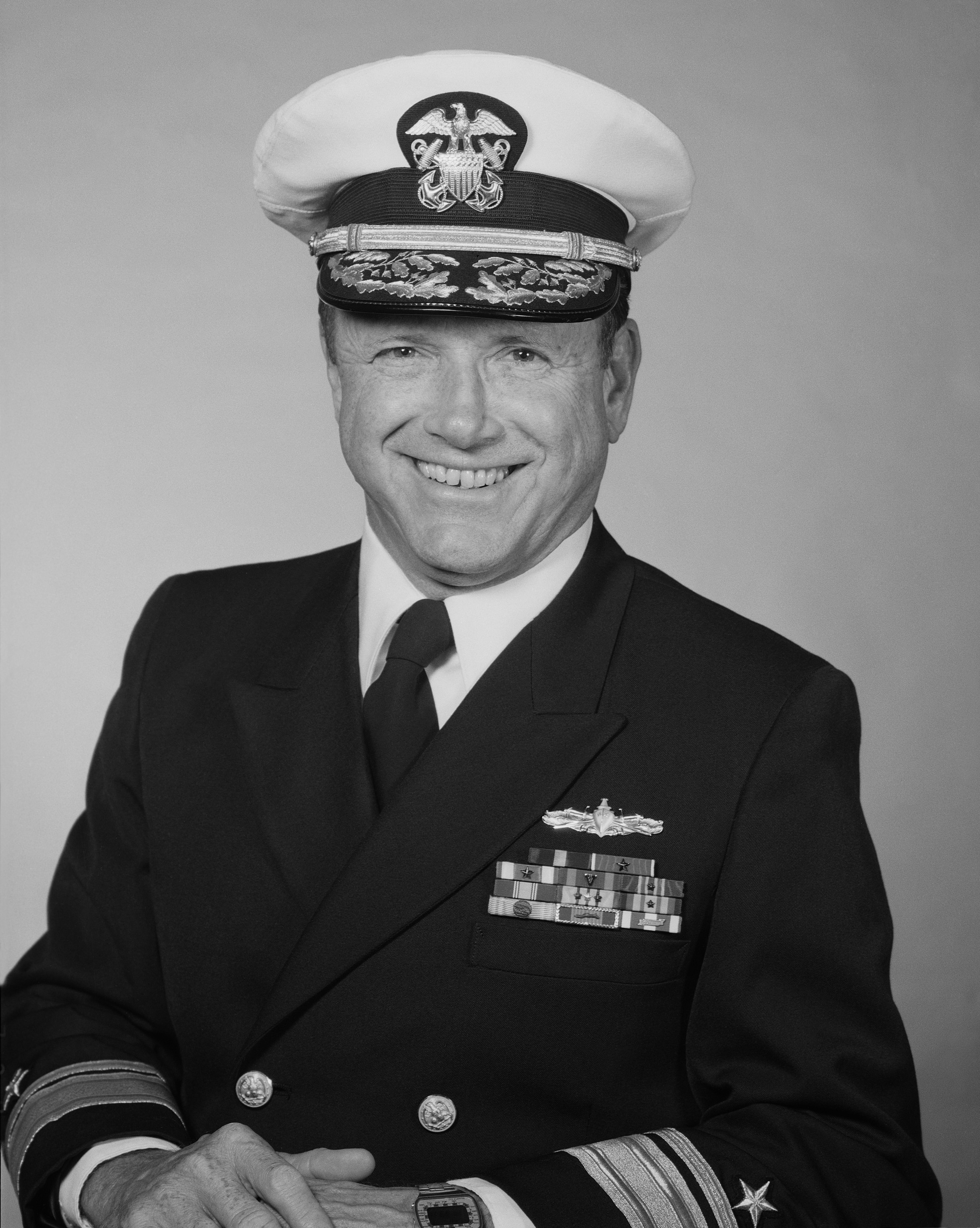
David E. Jeremiah

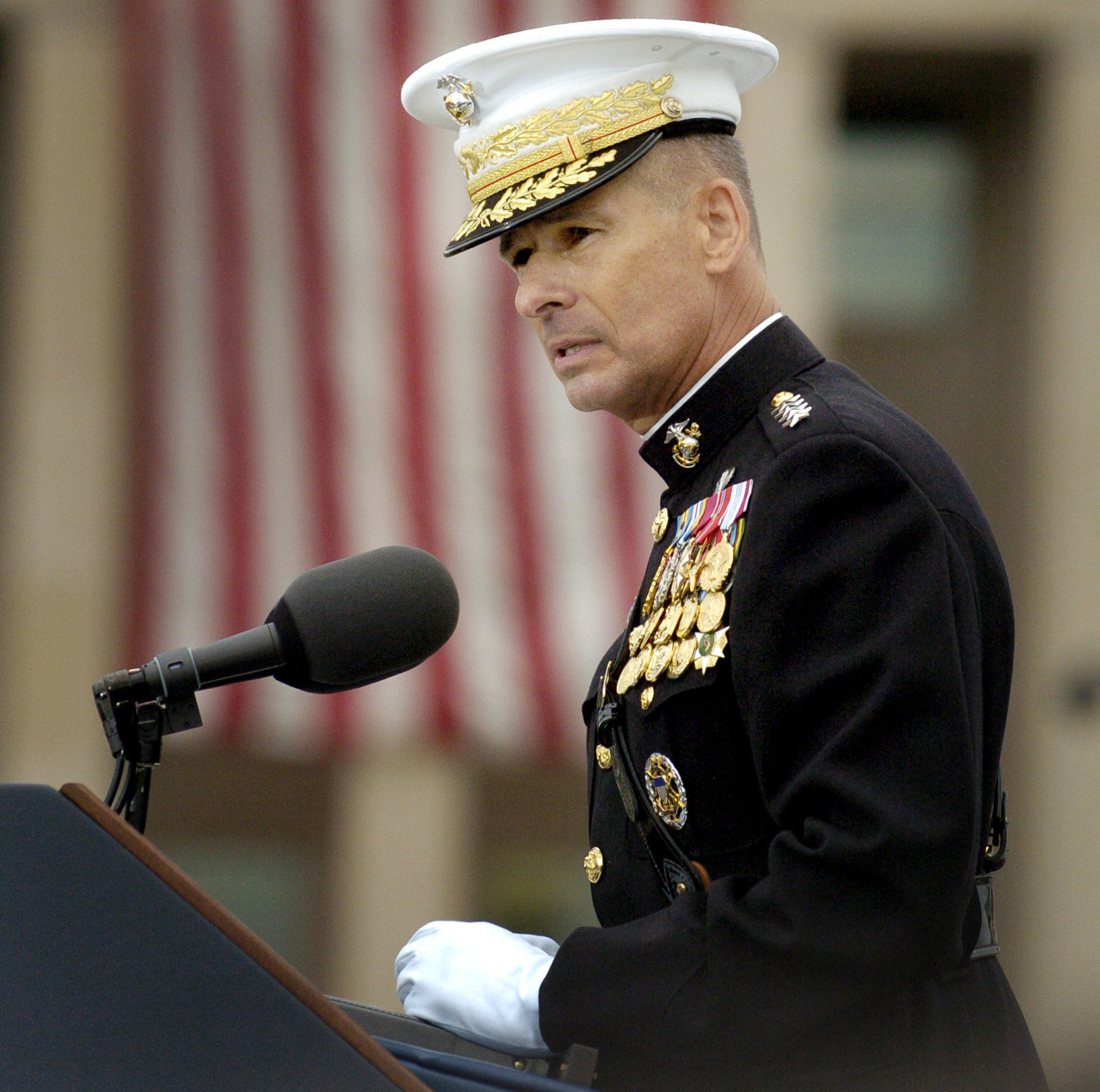
Peter Pace

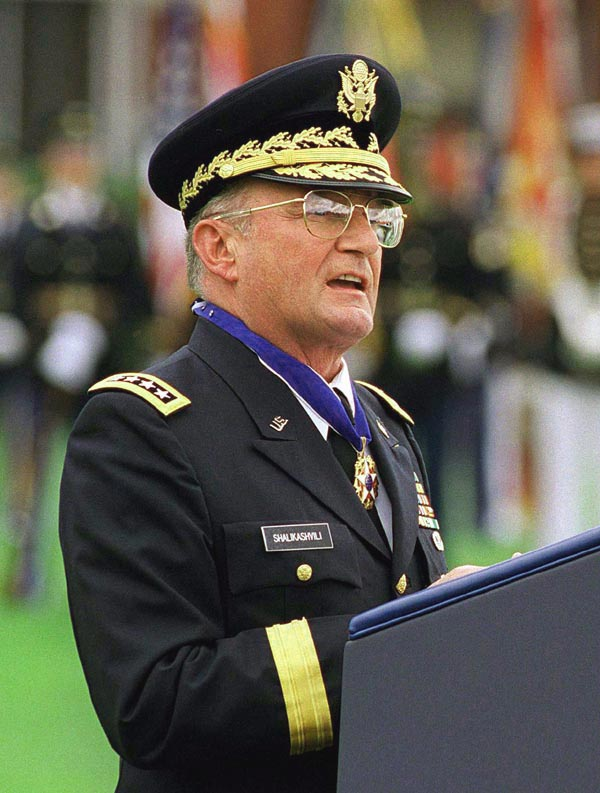
John Shalikashvili

John William Vessey Jr.

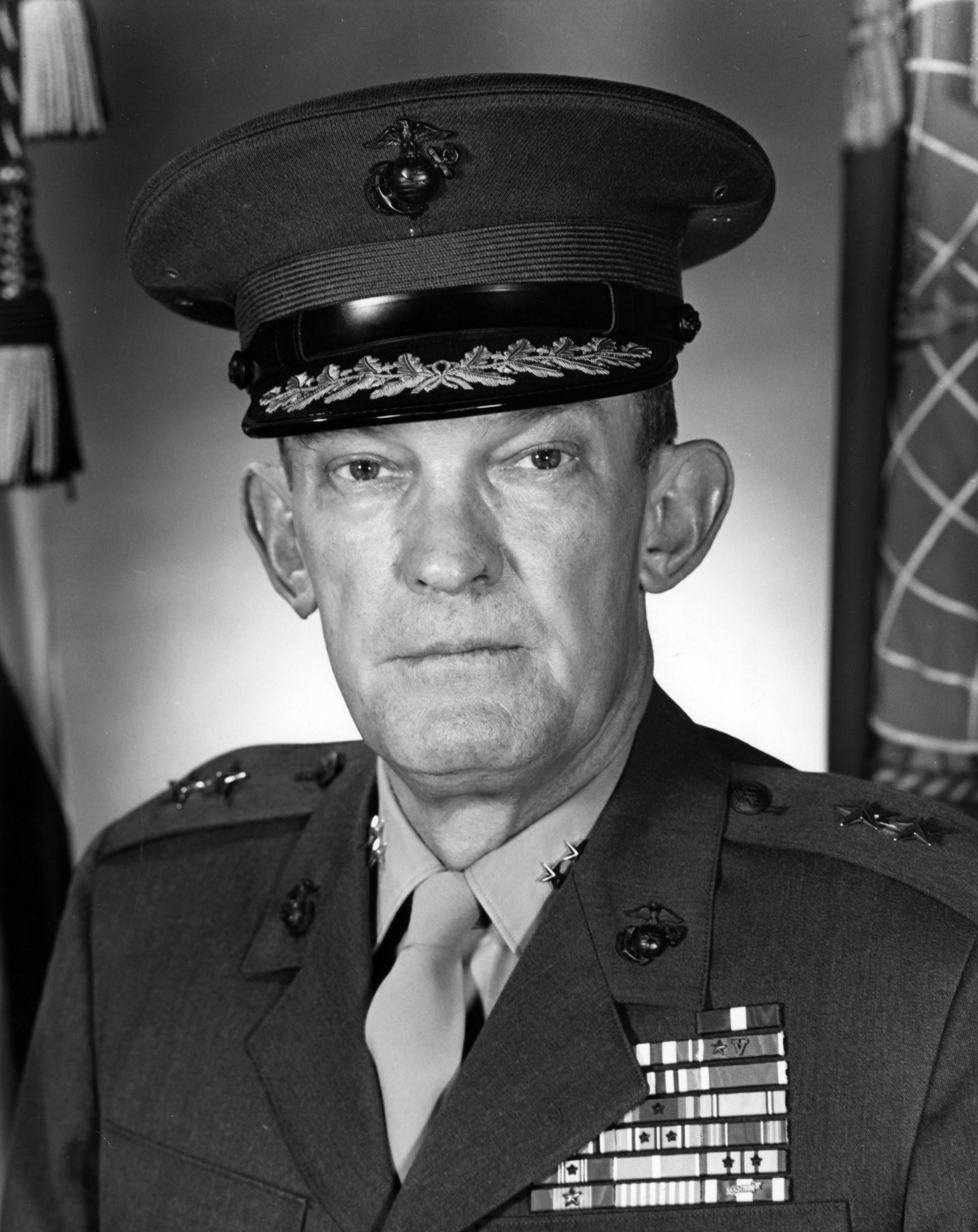
Charles F. Widdecke

- Thad Allen (MPA), Admiral, U.S. Coast Guard, 23rd Commandant of the Coast Guard
- Earl E. Anderson (J.D.), General, U.S. Marine Corps, 15th Assistant Commandant of the Marine Corps
- Richard A. Appelbaum, Rear Admiral, U.S. Coast Guard
- Vaughn Ary, Major General, U.S. Marine Corps
- Edward L. Beach Jr. (M.A.), Captain, U.S. Navy
- W. W. Behrens Jr., Vice Admiral, U.S. Navy
- Thomas A. Benes, Major General, U.S. Marine Corps
- Mark M. Boatner III, Colonel, U.S. Army
- Robert D. Bohn, Major General, U.S. Marine Corps
- Arnold W. Braswell, Lt. General, U.S. Air Force
- F. Taylor Brown, Rear Admiral, U.S. Navy
- Edwin H. Burba Jr., General, U.S. Army, 9th commander of U.S. Army Forces Command
- Murdock A. Campbell, Major General, U.S. Army
- George William Casey Sr., Major General, 36th Chief of Staff of the U.S. Army
- John T. Chain Jr., General, U.S. Air Force, Commander of the Strategic Air Command
- John R. D. Cleland, Major General, U.S. Army
- Sandy Daniels, Rear Admiral, U.S. Navy
- Sharon K.G. Dunbar, Major General, U.S. Air Force
- Lincoln D. Faurer, Lt. General, U.S. Air Force; 10th director National Security Agency (NSA)
- Sylvester R. Foley Jr., Admiral, U.S. Navy, 48th Commander, U.S. Pacific Fleet
- Frank Freyer, Captain, U.S. Navy; 14th Naval Governor of Guam and Chief of Staff of the Peruvian Navy
- John Fugh, Major General, U.S. Army; the first Chinese American to attain general officer status in the Army, judge advocate general
- Charles A. Gabriel, General, 11th Chief of staff of the Air Force
- Harold L. George, Lt. General, Air Corps Tactical School instructor, aviation pioneer who helped with the concept of daylight precision bombing; mayor of Beverly Hills
- Vincent L. Griffith, Rear Admiral, U.S. Navy
- John B. Hayes (M.A.), Admiral, 16th commandant of the Coast Guard
- Robert T. Herres, General, U.S. Air Force, first vice chairman of the Joint Chiefs of Staff
- David E. Jeremiah, Admiral, U.S. Navy, second vice chairman of the Joint Chiefs of Staff; acting chairman of the Joint Chiefs of Staff
- Frederick Kroesen, General, U.S. Army; 16th Vice Chief of Staff of the United States Army
- Charles C. Krulak, General, 31st commandant of the United States Marine Corps
- Bruce M. Lawlor (B.S., J.D., D.Sc.), Major General, U.S. Army; first commander of Joint Task Force-Civil Support and first Chief of Staff at the Department of Homeland Security
- James F. Lawrence Jr., Brigadier General, U.S. Marine Corps, Navy Cross recipient in the Korean War, and the first Marine lawyer to attain general rank
- Osmund A. Leahy, Major General, U.S. Army; highly decorated combat leader in World War II
- Lloyd R. Leavitt Jr., Lt. General, U.S. Air Force, 13th Vice Commander-in-Chief, Strategic Air Command
- Fred K. Mahaffey, General, U.S. Army, Commander of the United States Readiness Command
- Gavin Marks, Brigadier General, U.S. Air Force, 31st Commandant of Cadets of the United States Air Force Academy
- Michael A. McAuliffe, Brigadier General, U.S. Air Force
- Thomas McInerney, Lt. General, U.S. Air Force
- Fran McKee, Rear Admiral, U.S. Navy first female officer to hold the rank of Admiral in the Navy
- John N. McLaughlin, Lt. General, U.S. Marine Corps, spent three years as a POW
- Merrill A. McPeak, General, U.S. Air Force; 14th Chief of Staff of the U.S. Air Force and Secretary of the Air Force
- Zeita Merchant, Rear Admiral, U.S. Coast Guard; first female African-American to be appointed rear admiral in the Coast Guard
- Billy Mitchell, Major General, U.S. Army
- Hal Moore, Lt. General, U.S. Army, author of We Were Soldiers Once… and Young;
- James P. Mullins, General, U.S. Air Force
- Spurgeon Neel, Major General, U.S. Army and father of Army aviation medicine
- Charles C. Noble, Major General, U.S. Army; worked on the Manhattan Project, led construction in Nuremberg after World War II, developed the early American ICBM program
- Peter George Olenchuk, Major General, U.S. Army
- David E. Ott, (MA, 1963), Lt. General, U.S. Army
- William Owens, Admiral, U.S. Navy, 3rd vice chairman of the Joint Chiefs of Staff
- Peter Pace, General, U.S. Marine Corps, 16th chairman of the Joint Chiefs of Staff
- Edwin P. Parker Jr., Major General, U.S. Army, commander of the 78th Infantry Division during World War II
- Frank E. Petersen, Lt. General, U.S. Marine Corps, first black Marine general, first black Marine aviator, first black commanding officer of a fighter squadron, an air group, and a major base
- Paul D. Phillips, Brigadier General, U.S. Army; oldest living West Point graduate.
- Bryce Poe II, General, U.S. Air Force
- Herman Poggemeyer Jr., Major General, U.S. Marine Corps
- John R. Ryan, Vice Admiral, U.S. Navy; superintendent of United States Naval Academy, chancellor of the State University of New York
- Michael P. Ryan, Major General, U.S. Marine Corps, co-founded Marine Corps Marathon
- Thomas M. Ryan Jr., General, U.S. Air Force
- Shanti Sethi, Captain, U.S. Navy, first Indian-American woman to command a major warship
- John Shalikashvili, General, U.S. Army, 13th chairman of the Joint Chiefs of Staff
- Sumner Shapiro, Rear Admiral, U.S. Navy
- Owen W. Siler, Admiral, U.S. Guard, 15th Commandant of the Coast Guard
- Ronald F. Silva, Rear Admiral, U.S. Coast Guard
- Donn A. Starry, General, U.S. Army
- Henry J. Stehling, Brigadier General, U.S. Air Force
- William W. Stickney, Major General, U.S. Marine Corps, Director of Marine Corps Reserve
- Dennis B. Sullivan, Brigadier General, U.S. Air Force
- Kenneth L. Tallman – Lt. General, U.S. Air Force, 8th Superintendent of the Air Force Academy
- Richard Horner Thompson, General, U.S. Army, 8th commanding general of Army Materiel Command
- John Tweedale (LL.B.), Colonel and Medal of Honor recipient, 1868
- James P. Ulm, Brigadier General, U.S. Air Force
- Hoyt S. Vandenberg Jr., Major General, U.S. Air Force
- John William Vessey Jr., General, U.S. Army, 10th chairman of the Joint Chiefs of Staff
- Sidney A. Wallace, Rear Admiral, U.S. Coast Guard
- Larry D. Welch, General, 12th chief of staff of the U.S. Air Force, commander, Strategic Air Command
- Richard M. Wells, Major General, U.S. Army, Director of the Defense Mapping Agency
- Don S. Wenger, Major General, U.S. Air Force
- Charles F. Widdecke (M.A.); Major General, U.S. Marine Corps, and recipient of Navy Cross during World War II
- Hugh E. Wild, Brigadier General, U.S. Air Force
- David W. Winn, Brigadier General, U.S. Air Force
- John W. Woodmansee, Lt. General, U.S. Army

== Politics ==
=== United States ===
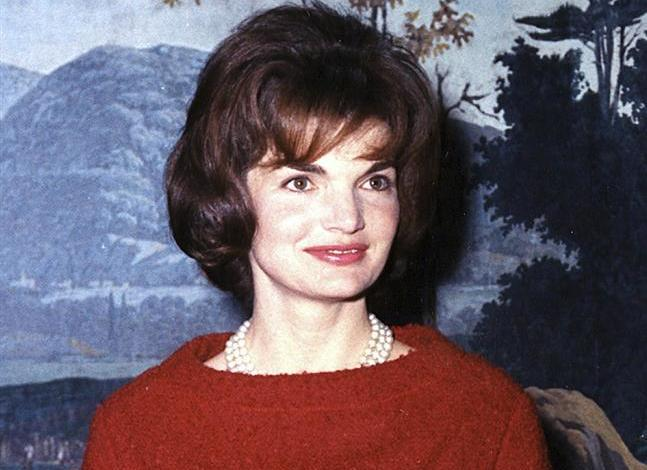
Jacqueline Bouvier Kennedy

==== First family ====
- Susan Ford, daughter of U.S. President Gerald Ford
- Lynda Bird Johnson, daughter of U.S. President Lyndon Johnson
- Jacqueline Bouvier Kennedy Onassis, First Lady of the United States
- Margaret Truman, daughter of U.S. President Harry S. Truman

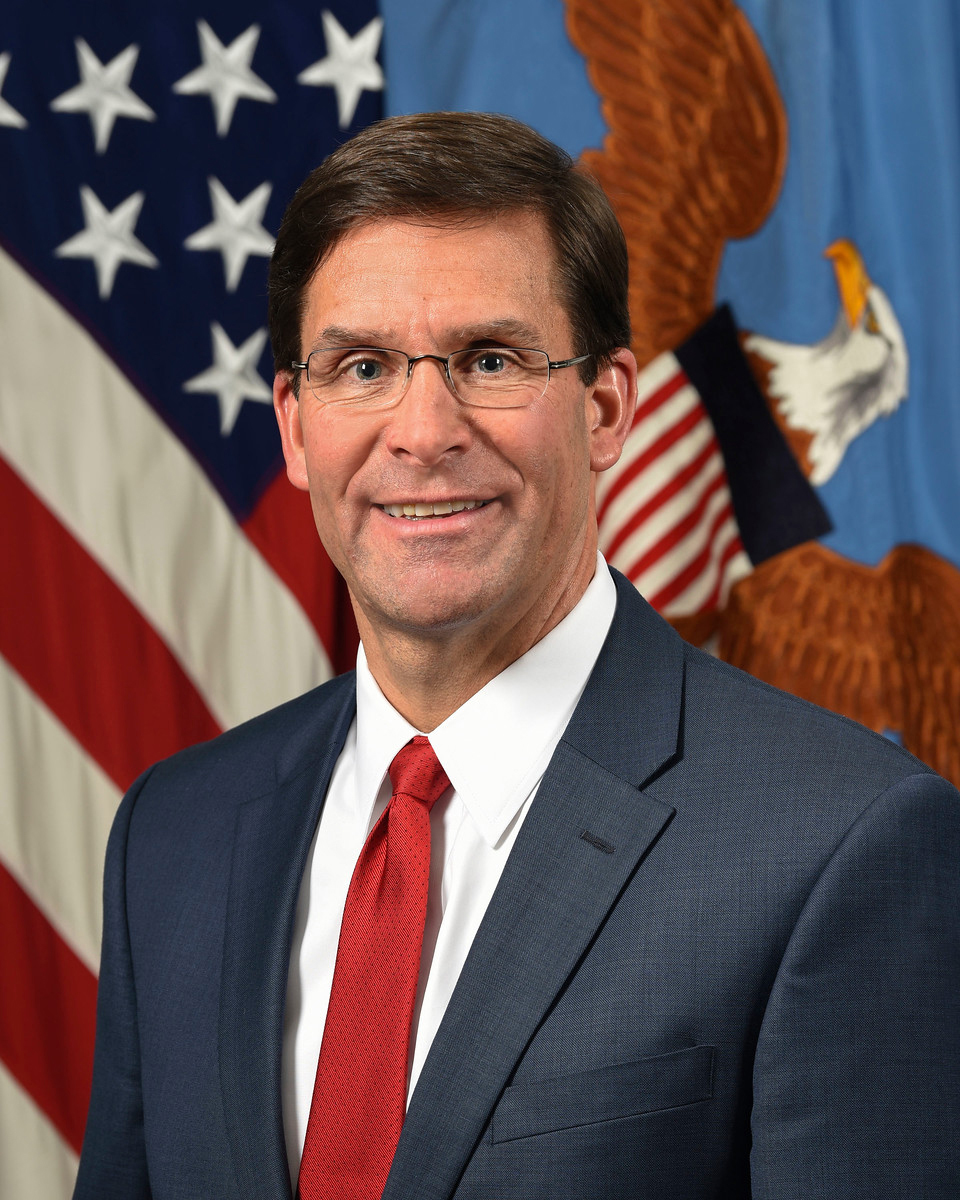
Mark Esper

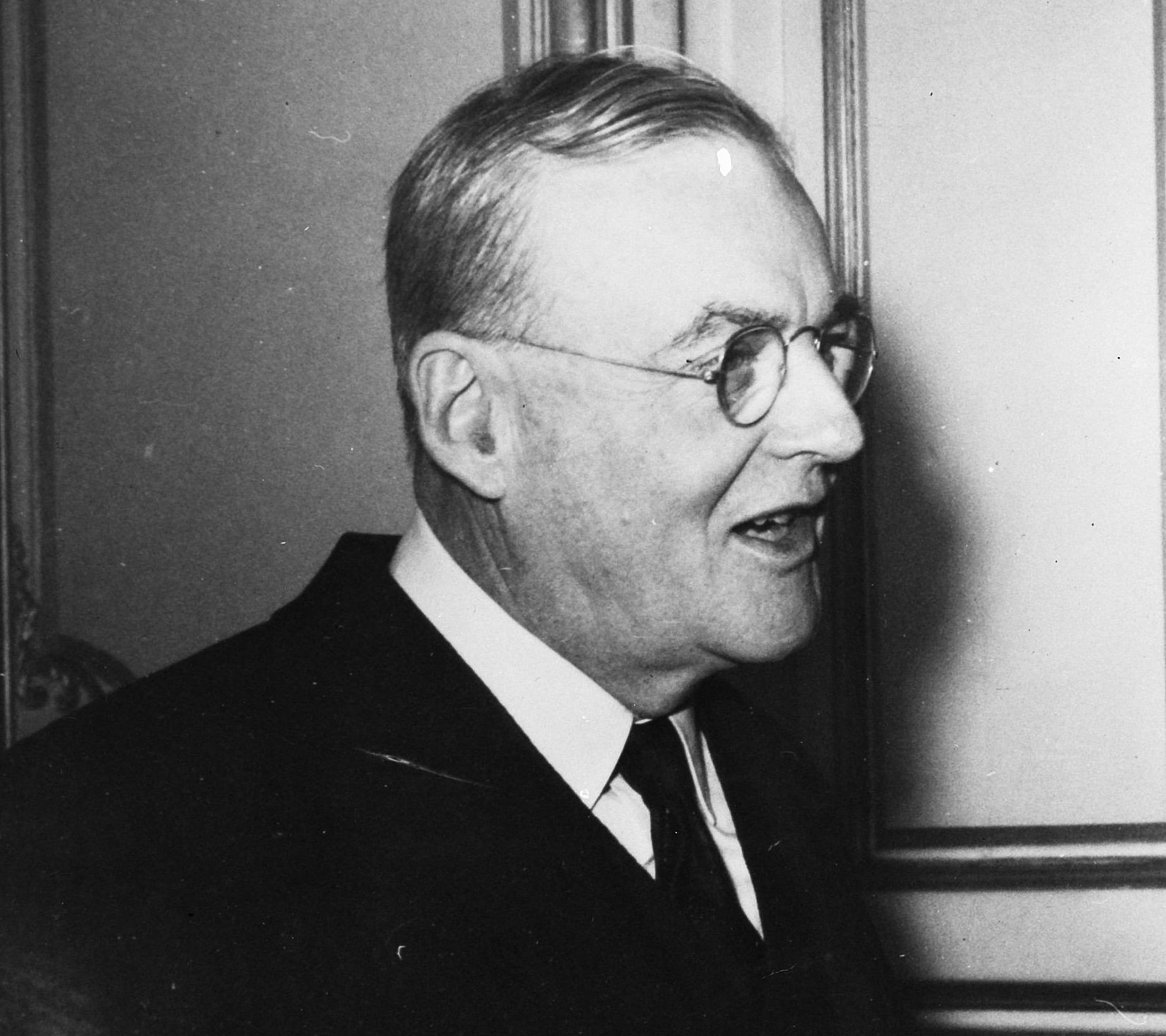
John Foster Dulles

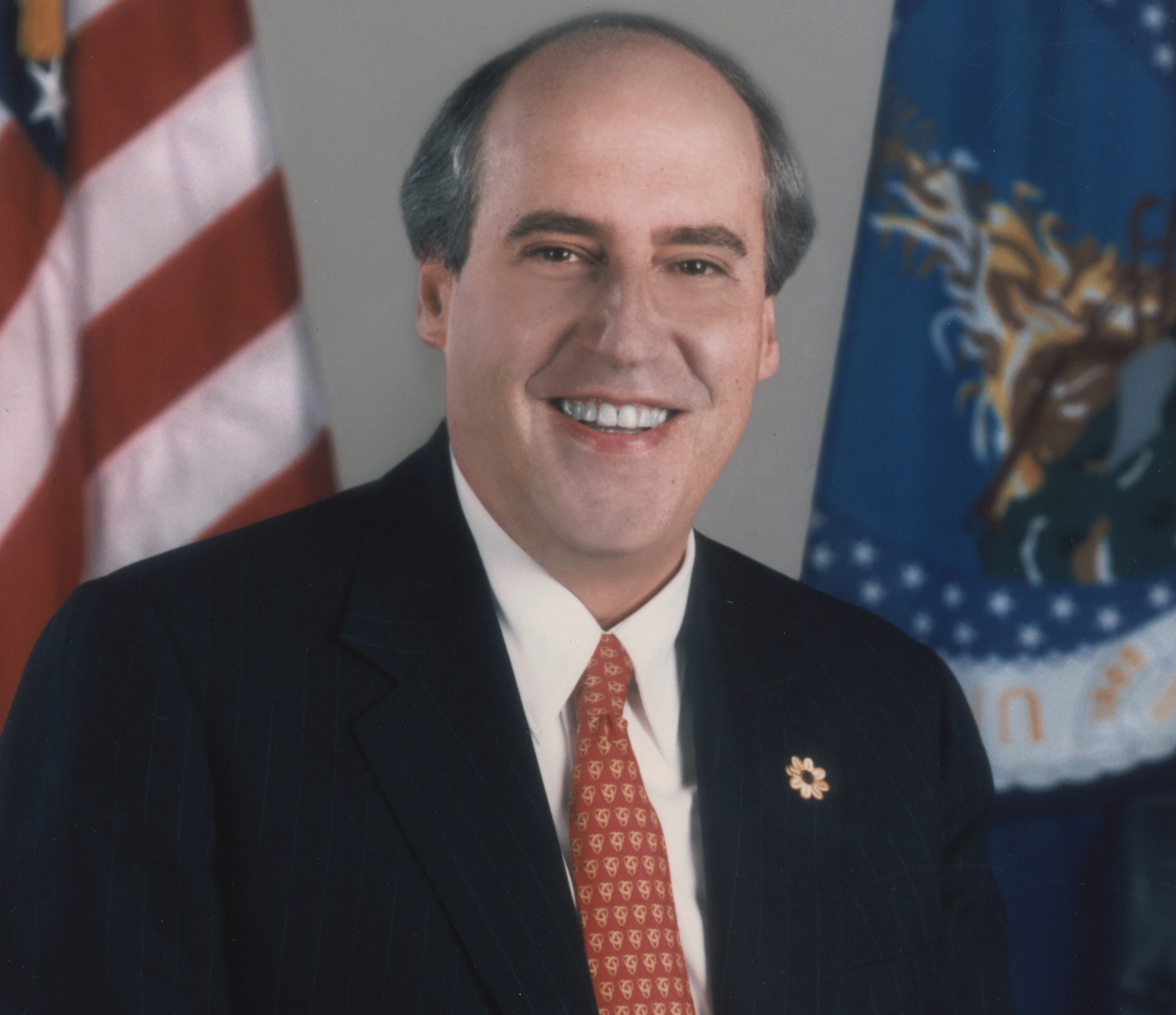
Dan Glickman

==== U.S. cabinet ====
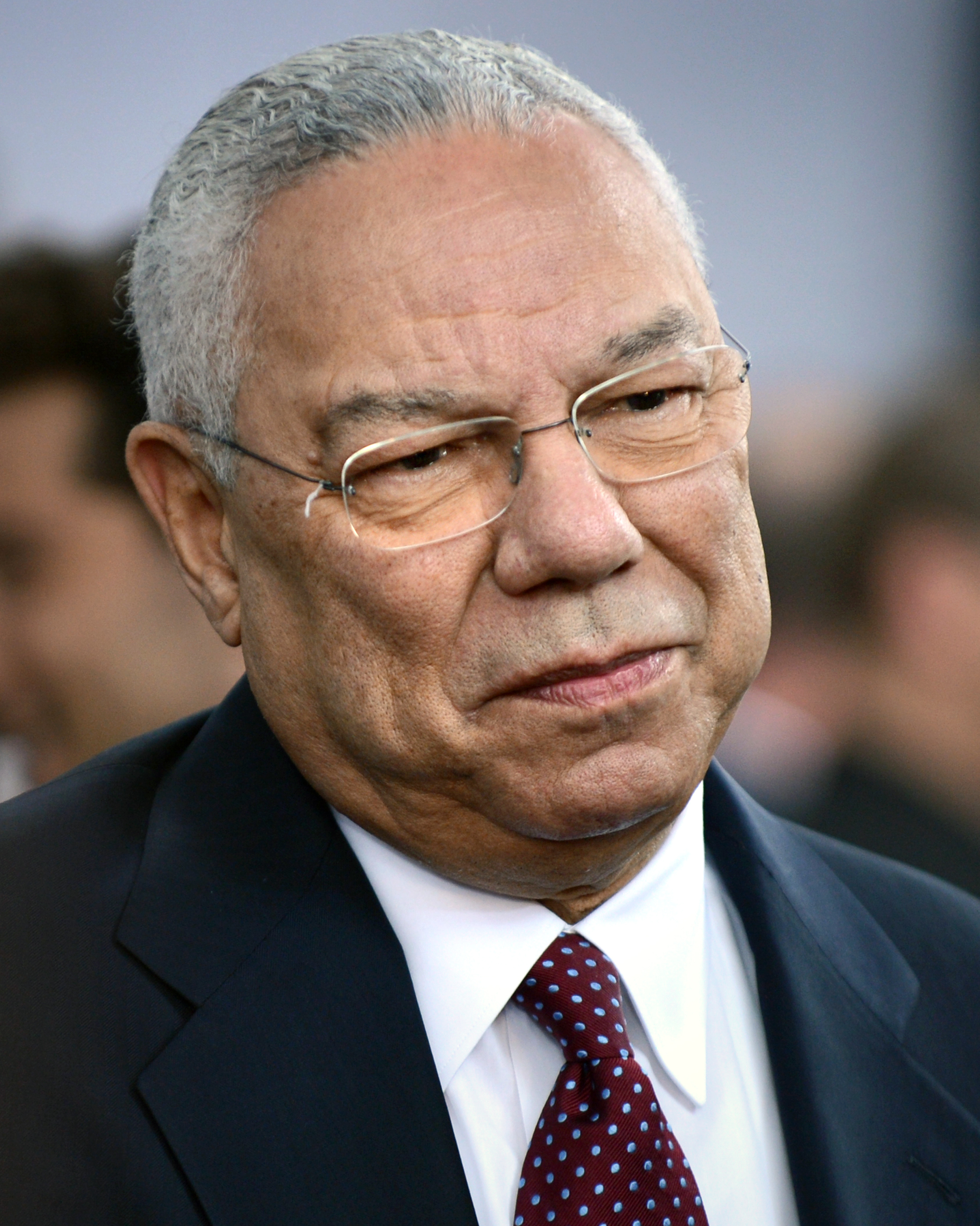
Colin Powell

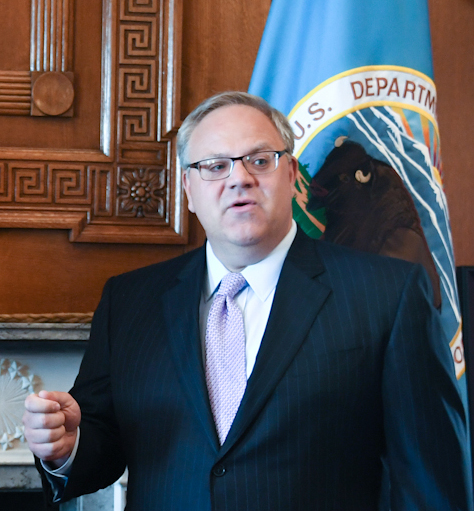
David Bernhardt

- William Barr (JD '77), United States Attorney General
- David Bernhardt (JD '94), United States Secretary of the Interior
- Henry Cisneros (DPA '76), United States Secretary of Housing and Urban Development; Mayor of San Antonio
- George B. Cortelyou (LLM 1896), United States Secretary of the Treasury, United States Postmaster General
- John Foster Dulles (JD 1911), United States Secretary of State, U.S. senator from New York
- Mark Esper (PhD '08), United States Secretary of Defense
- Dan Glickman (JD '69), United States Secretary of Agriculture, U.S. House of Representatives from Kansas; Chairman and Chief Executive Officer of the Motion Picture Association of America
- Patricia Roberts Harris (JD '60), United States Secretary of Housing and Urban Development, United States Secretary of Health and Human Services, and United States Ambassador to Luxembourg
- Patrick J. Hurley (JD 1908, LLM 1913), United States Secretary of War, United States Ambassador to New Zealand, and United States Ambassador to the Republic of China
- Stephen L. Johnson (MS '76), Administrator of the Environmental Protection Agency
- David M. Kennedy (MA '35, JD '37), United States Secretary of the Treasury, United States permanent representatives to NATO
- Mike McConnell (MPA '86), Director of National Intelligence, Director of the National Security Agency
- Bill McGinley, White House Cabinet Secretary
- Christopher C. Miller (BA '87), United States Secretary of Defense, Director of the National Counterterrorism Center
- Colin Powell (MBA '71), United States Secretary of State, Chairman of the Joint Chiefs of Staff, United States National Security Advisor
- George W. Romney, United States Secretary of Housing and Urban Development, Governor of Michigan
- Susan Schwab (PhD '93), United States Trade Representative
- John W. Snow (JD '67), United States Secretary of the Treasury, Administrator of the National Highway Traffic Safety Administration
- Russell Vought, Director of Office of Management and Budget
- Mike Young (MBA '91), United States Secretary of Agriculture

==== U.S. senators ====
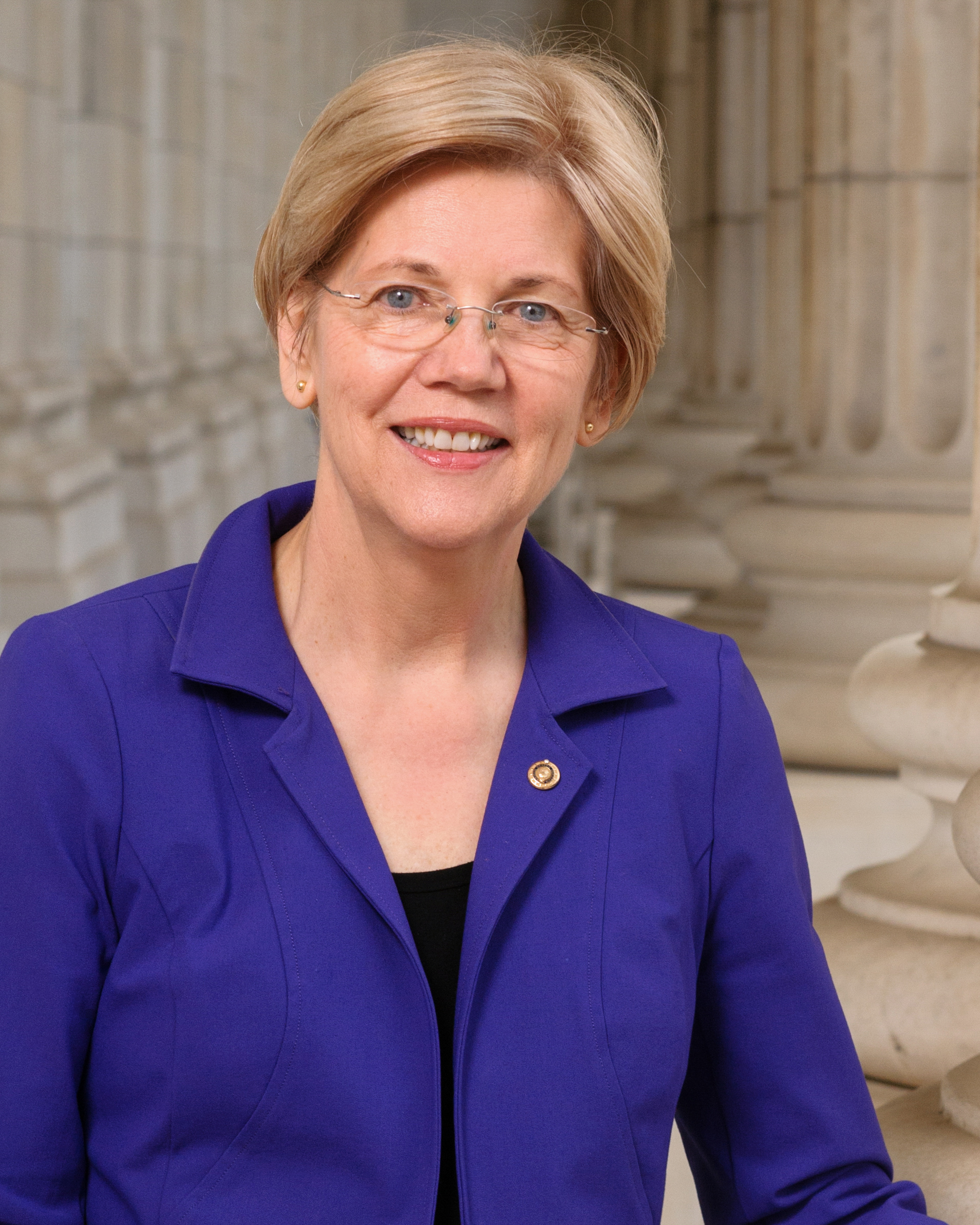
Elizabeth Warren

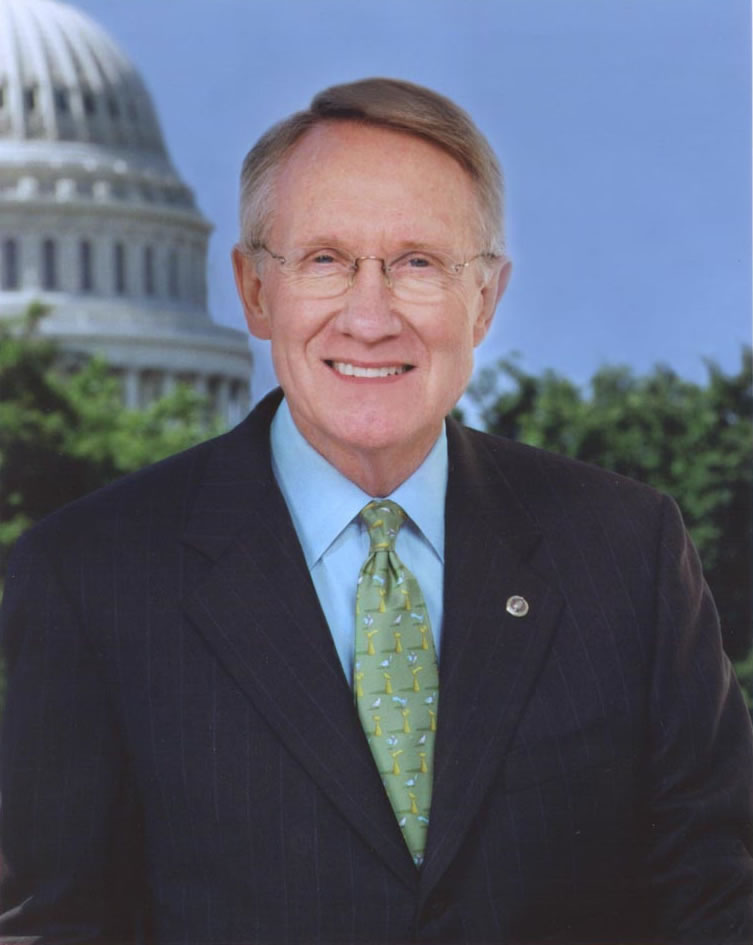
Harry Reid

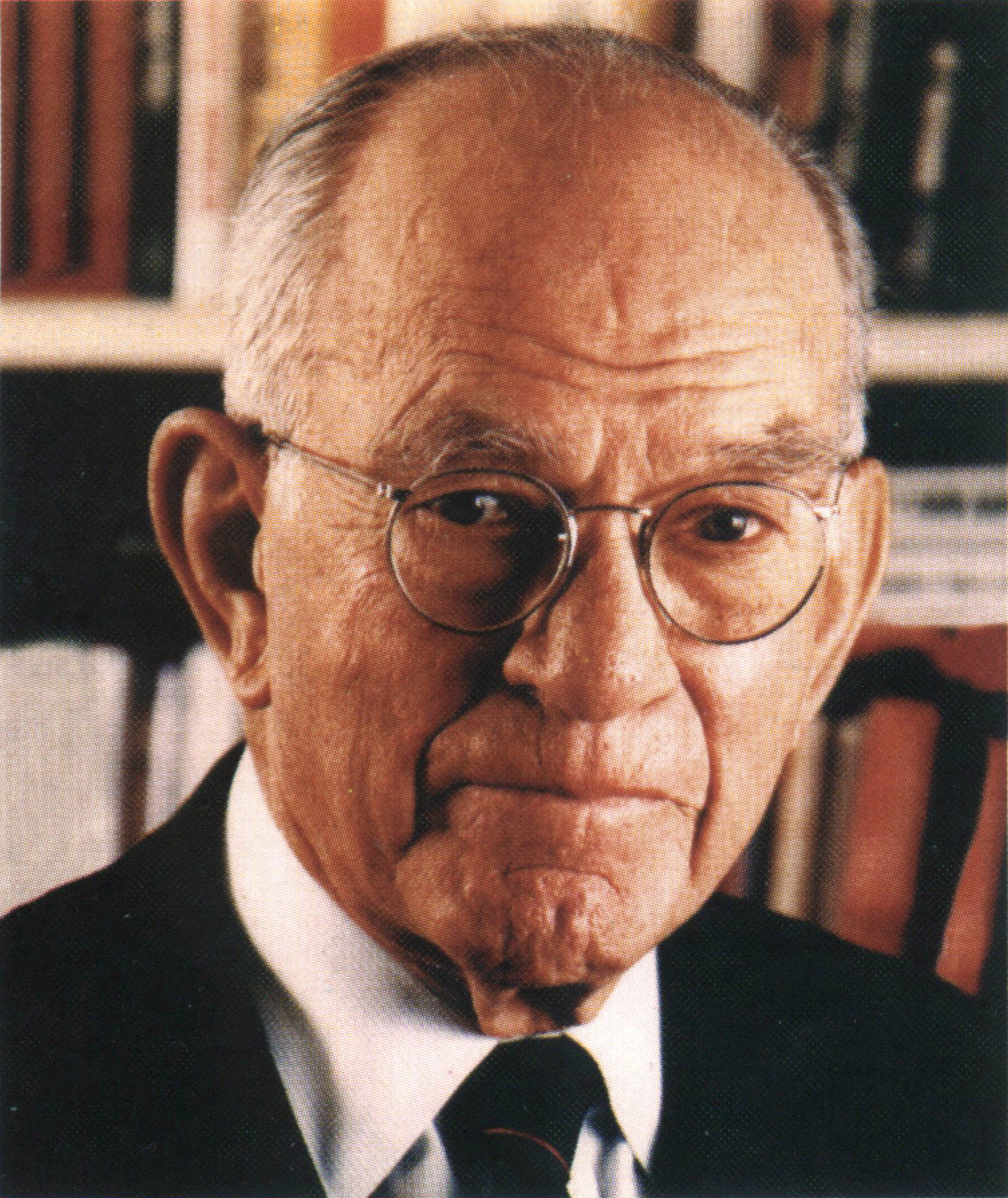
J. William Fulbright

- Hank Brown, U.S. senator from Colorado, U.S. House of Representatives from Colorado, Colorado Senate, president of the University of Colorado, president of University of Northern Colorado
- Robert Byrd (attended), U.S. Senate from West Virginia; president pro tempore of the United States Senate, U.S. House of Representatives from West Virginia, West Virginia Senate, West Virginia House of Delegates
- Jean Carnahan, U.S. senator from Missouri, First Lady of Missouri
- Bennett Champ Clark, U.S. senator from Missouri, Judge of the United States Court of Appeals for the District of Columbia Circuit
- Kent Conrad, U.S. senator from North Dakota, Tax Commissioner of North Dakota
- Norris Cotton, U.S. senator from New Hampshire, U.S. House of Representatives from New Hampshire, Speaker of the New Hampshire House of Representatives
- Larry Craig, U.S. senator from Idaho, U.S. House of Representatives from Idaho, Idaho Senate
- Jeremiah Denton, U.S. senator from Alabama, United States Navy two-star admiral
- Tammy Duckworth, U.S. senator from Illinois, U.S. House of Representatives
- Mike Enzi, U.S. senator from Wyoming, Wyoming Senate, Wyoming House of Representatives, mayor of Gillette, Wyoming
- J. William Fulbright, U.S. senator from Arkansas, U.S. House of Representatives from Arkansas, president of the University of Arkansas, founder of the Fulbright Program
- William A. Harris, U.S. senator from Kansas, U.S. House of Representatives from Kansas, Kansas Senate
- Daniel O. Hastings, U.S. senator from Delaware, Delaware Secretary of State
- Gordon J. Humphrey, U.S. senator from New Hampshire, New Hampshire Senate
- Daniel Inouye, U.S. senator from Hawaii, president pro tempore of the United States Senate, U.S. House of Representatives from Hawaii
- William E. Jenner, U.S. senator from Indiana, Indiana Senate
- Daniel T. Jewett, U.S. senator from Missouri
- Blair Lee I, U.S. senator from Maryland, Missouri House of Representatives
- Frank Moss, U.S. senator from Utah
- Francis G. Newlands, U.S. senator from Nevada, U.S. House of Representatives from Nevada
- Harry Reid (JD 1964), U.S. senator from Nevada, Senate Majority Leader, U.S. House of Representatives from Nevada, Lieutenant Governor of Nevada
- William L. Scott, U.S. senator from Virginia, U.S. House of Representatives from Virginia
- Howard Sutherland, U.S. senator from West Virginia, U.S. House of Representatives from West Virginia, West Virginia State Senate
- John Warner, U.S. senator from Virginia, United States Secretary of the Navy
- Elizabeth Warren, U.S. senator from Massachusetts

==== U.S. representatives ====
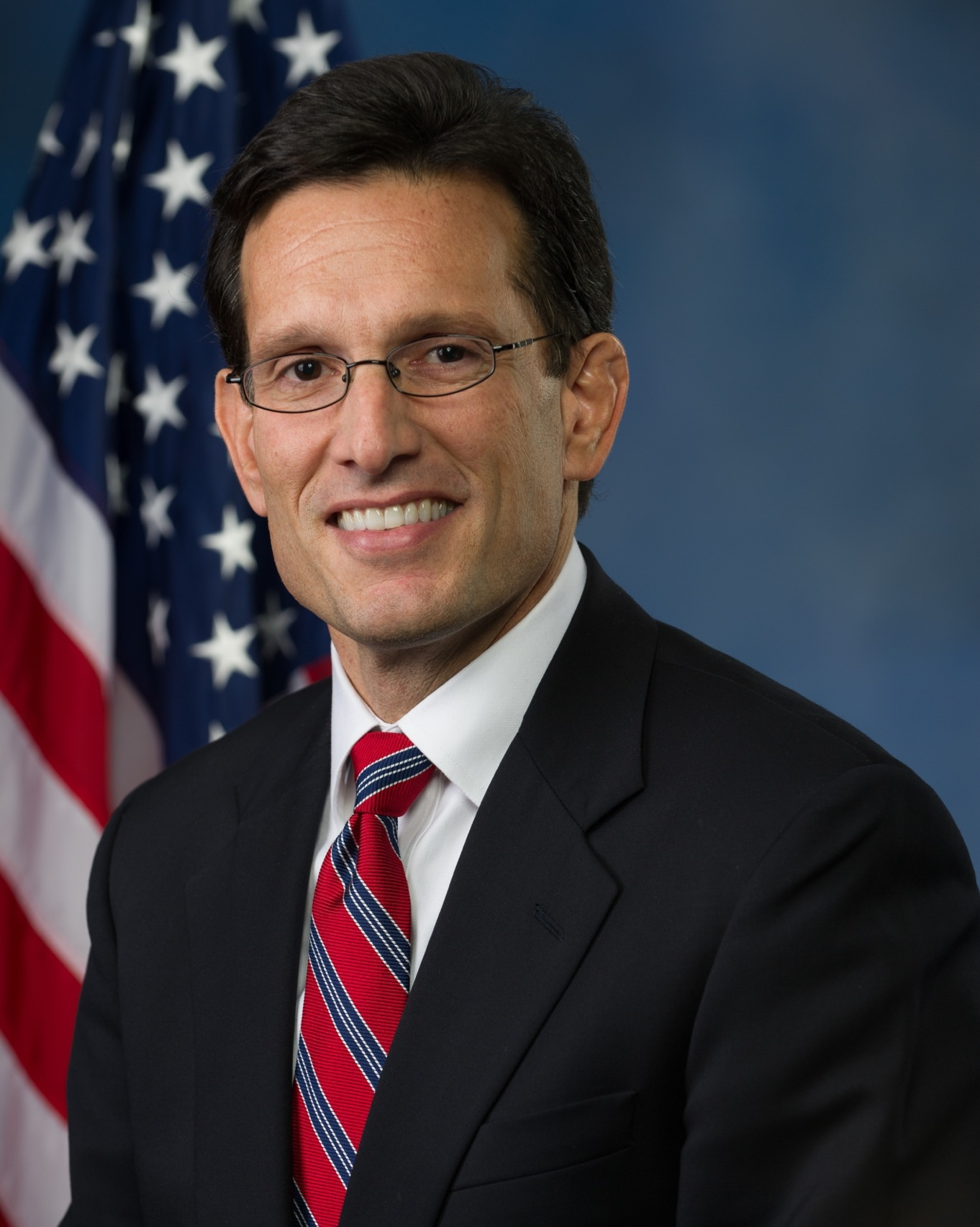
Eric Cantor

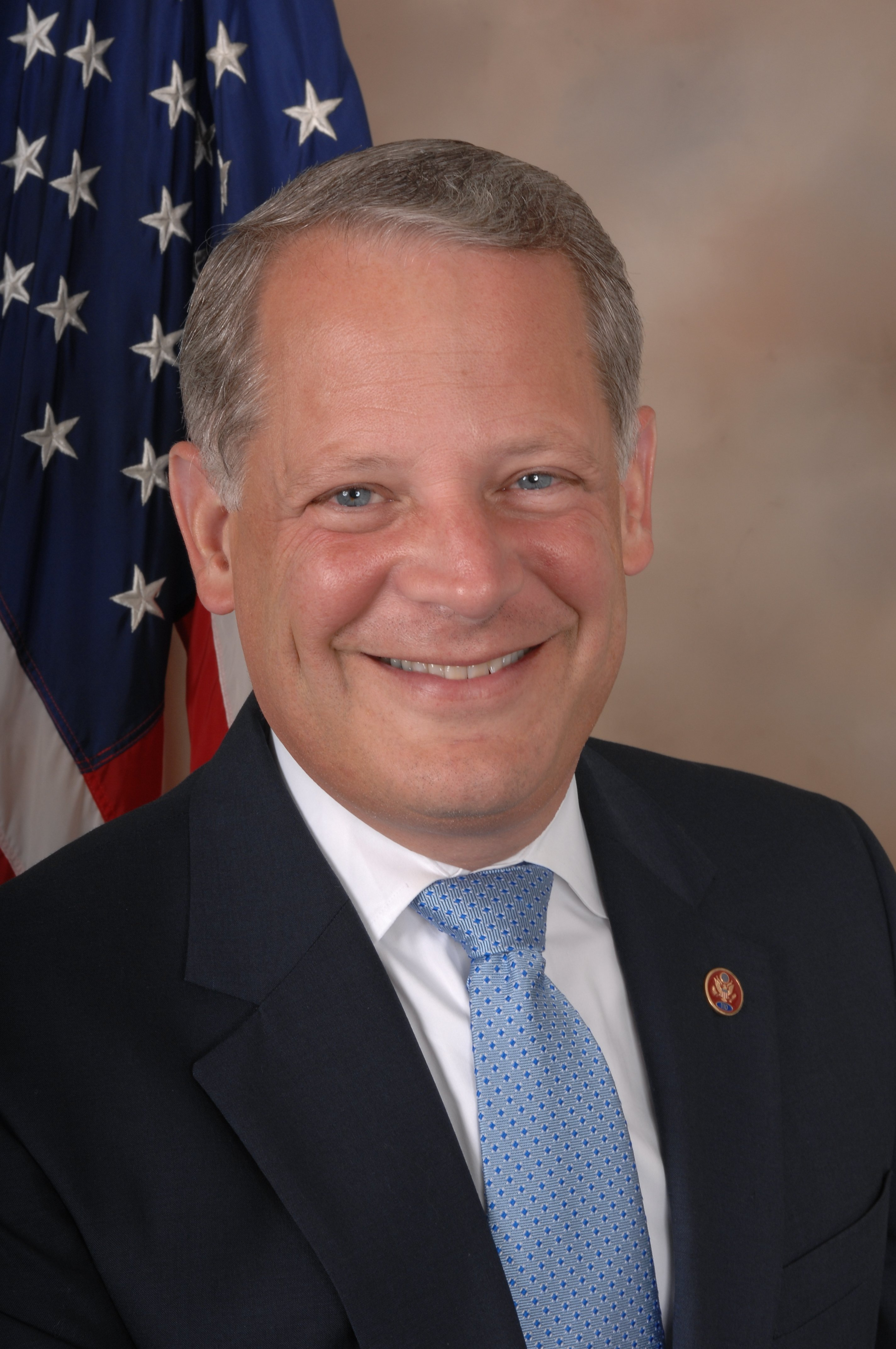
Steve Israel

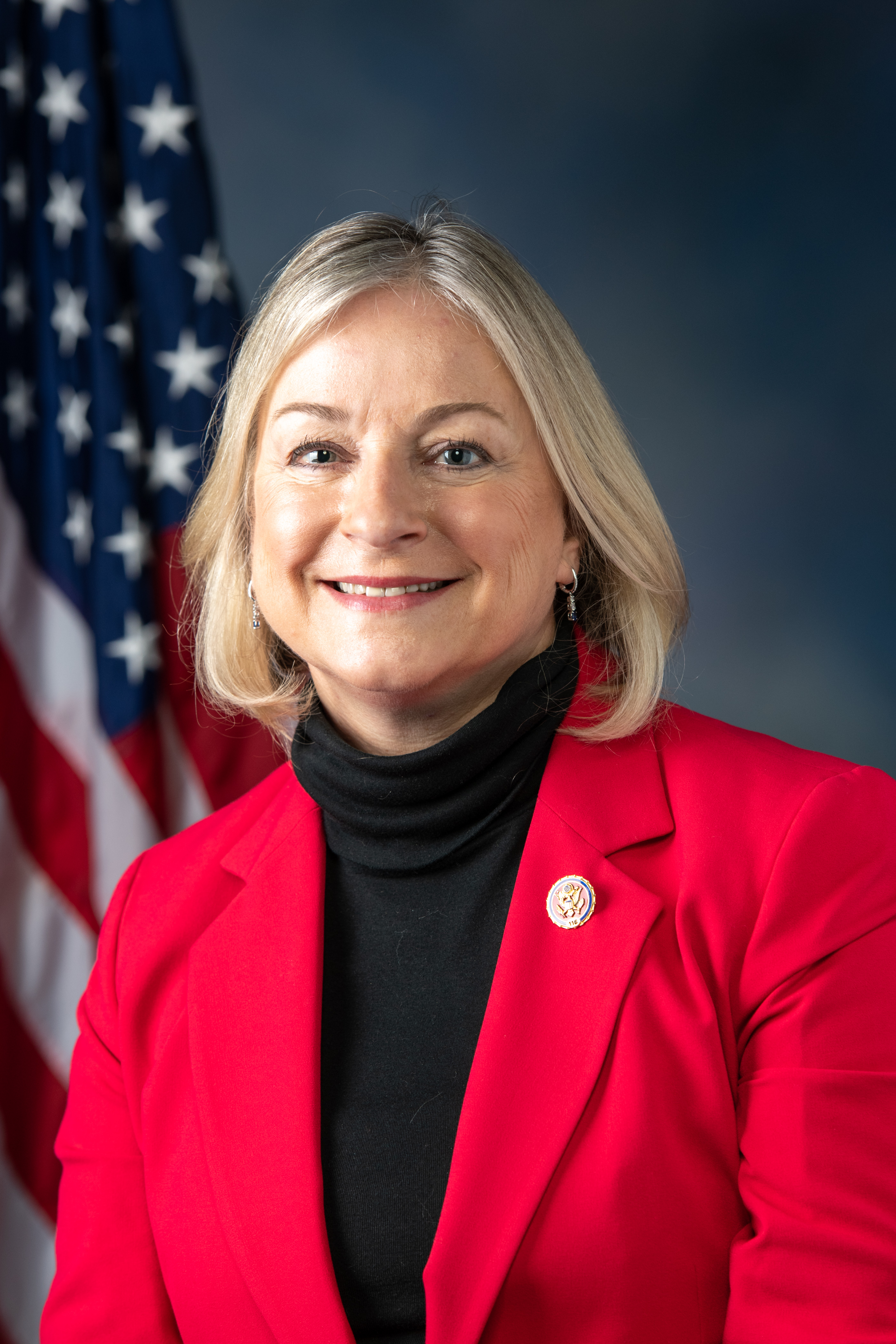
Susan Wild

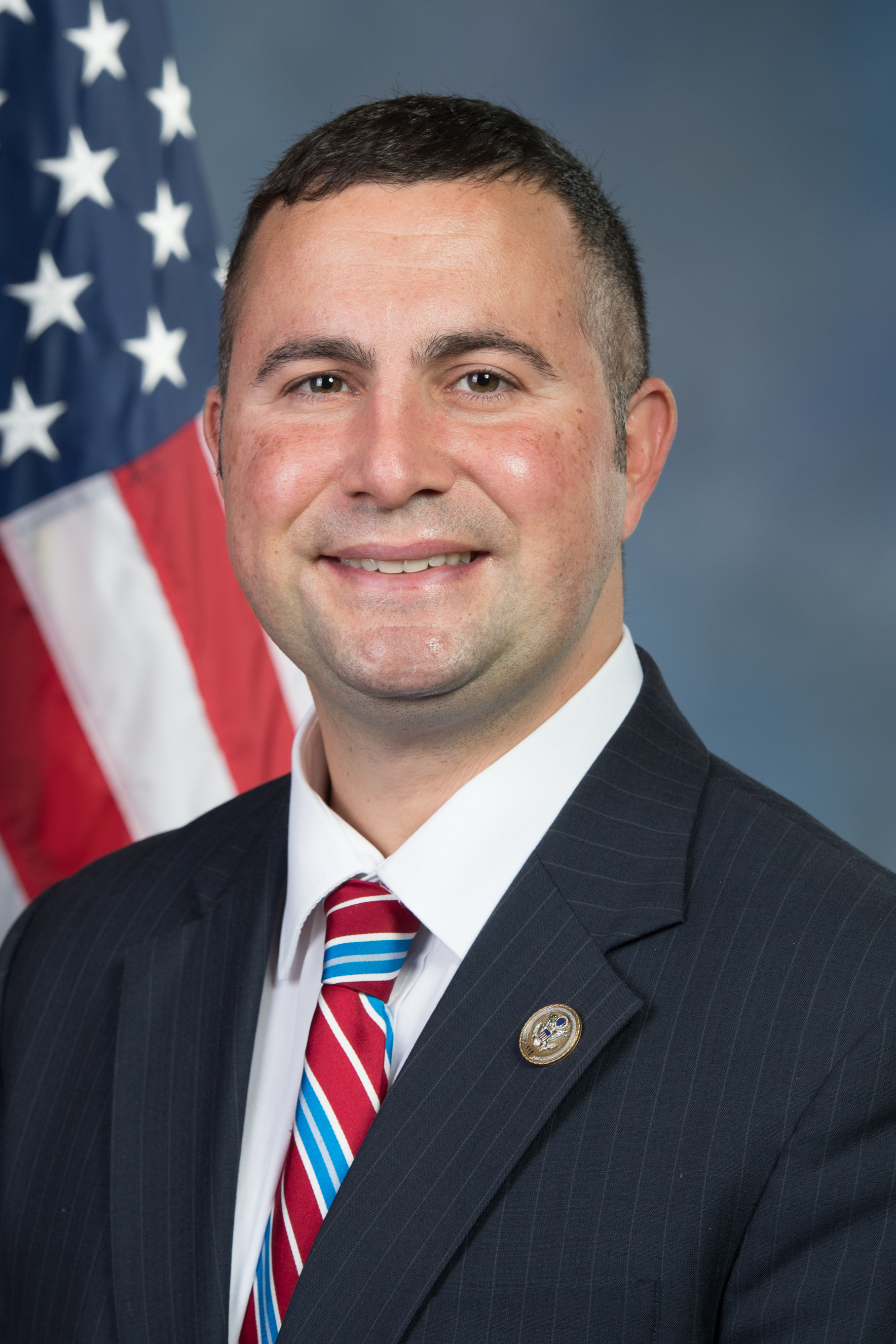
Darren Soto

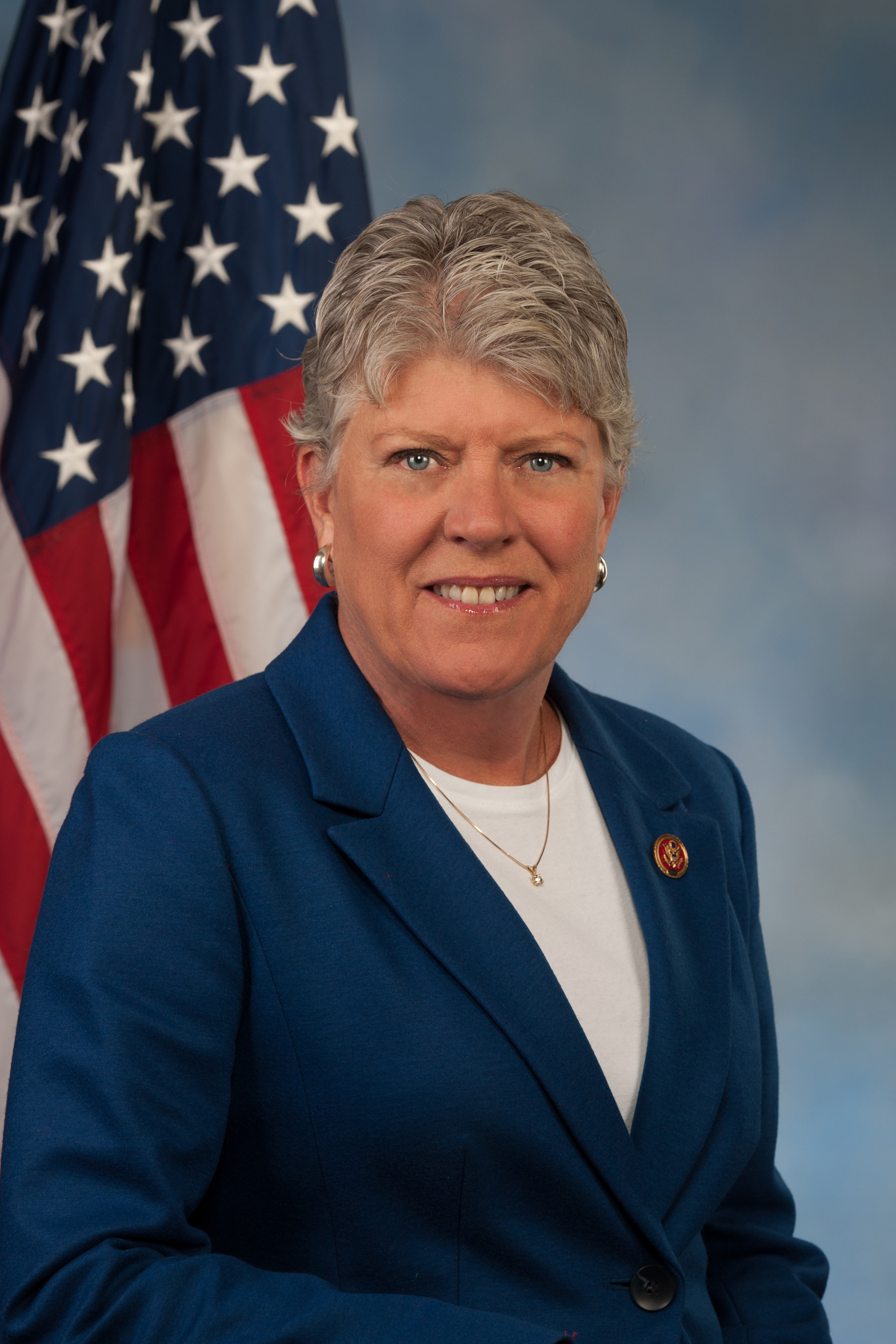
Julia Brownley

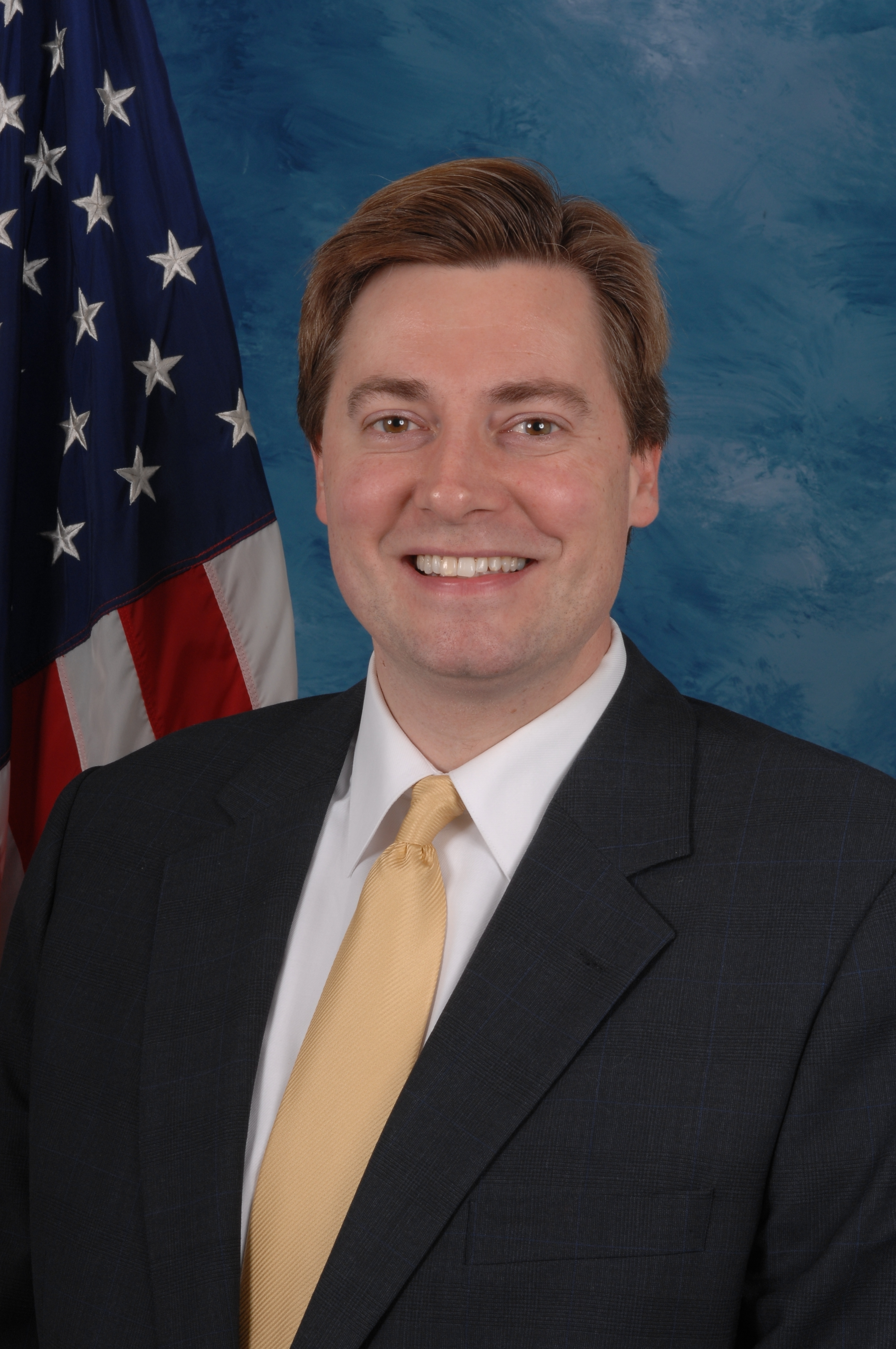
Jason Altmire

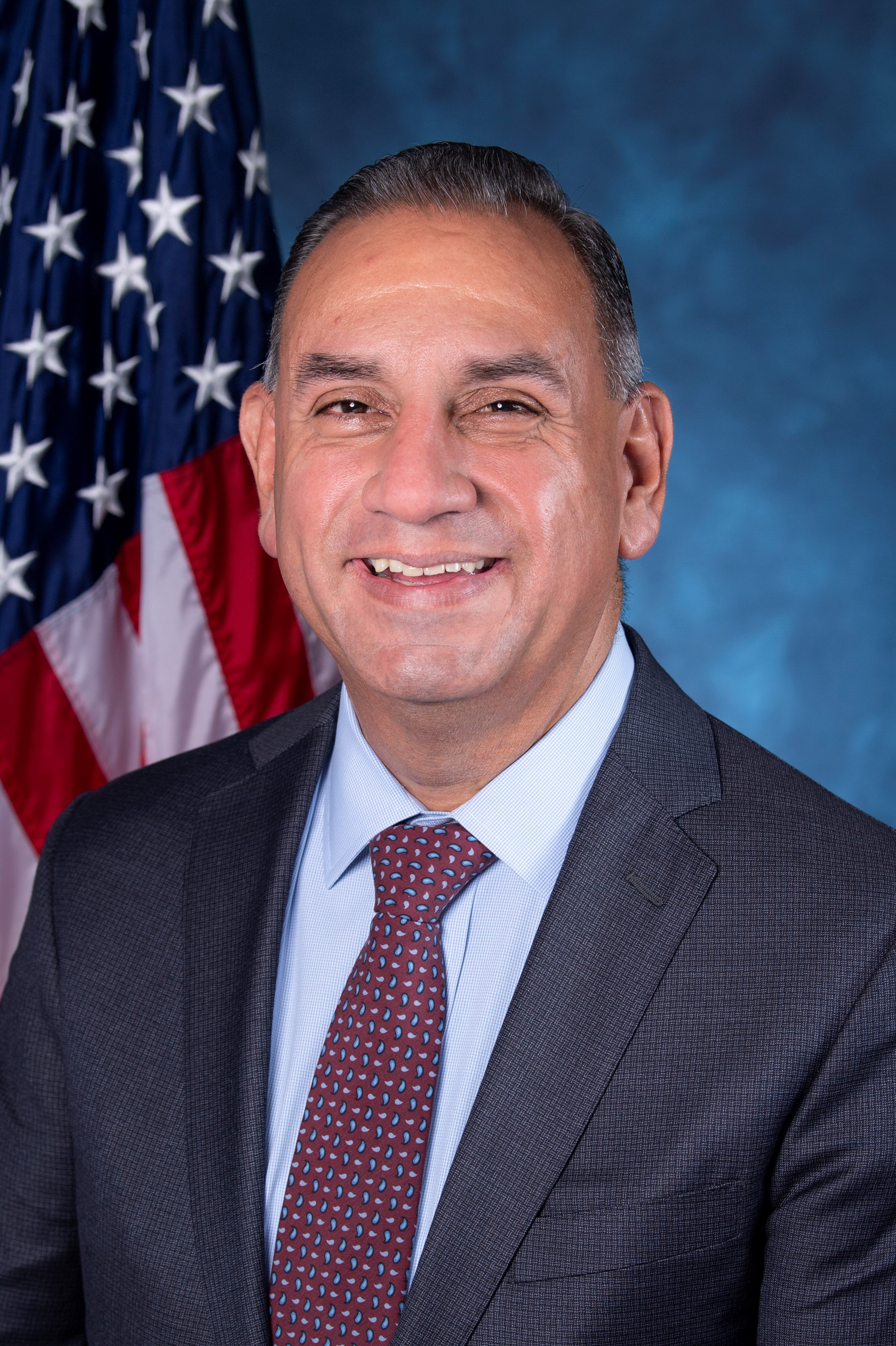
Gil Cisneros

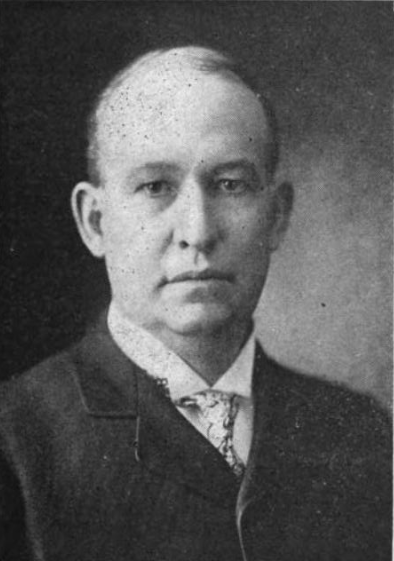
John H. Foster

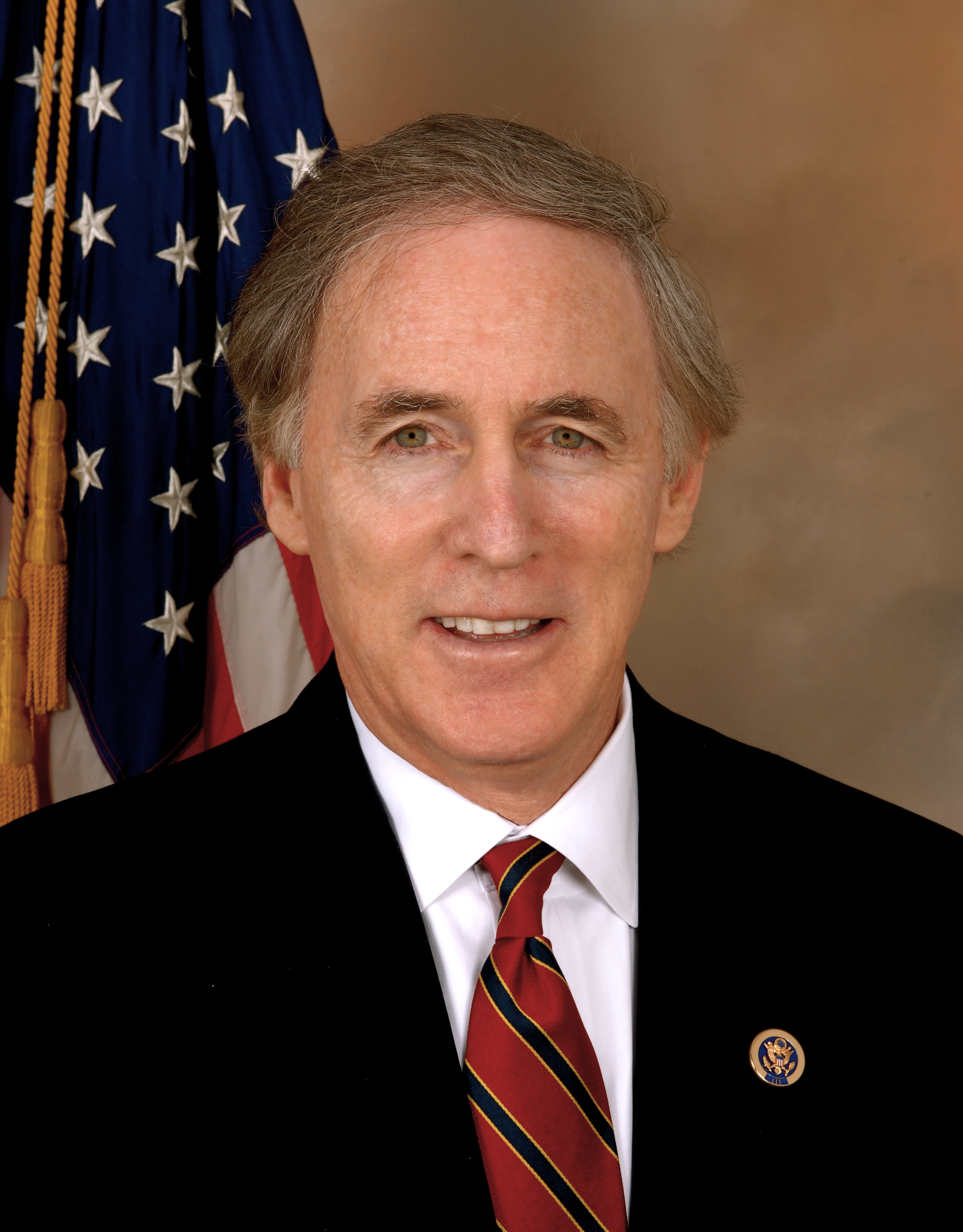
Cliff Stearns

- E. Ross Adair, U.S. House of Representatives from Indiana; U.S. Ambassador to Ethiopia
- Jason Altmire (1998), U.S. House of Representatives from Pennsylvania
- Henry M. Baker, U.S. House of Representatives from New Hampshire, New Hampshire House of Representatives, New Hampshire Senate
- Michael D. Barnes, U.S. House of Representatives from Maryland
- Bob Barr (1972), U.S. House of Representatives from Georgia, President of the National Rifle Association
- Henry W. Barry, U.S. House of Representatives from Mississippi
- Helen Delich Bentley, U.S. House of Representatives from Maryland
- Michael Bilirakis (1960), U.S. House of Representatives from Florida
- Vicente T. Blaz, U.S. House of Representatives from Guam, United States Marine Corps Brigadier General
- Charles Harrison Brown, U.S. House of Representatives from Missouri
- Garry E. Brown, U.S. House of Representatives from Michigan, Michigan Senate
- Julia Brownley, U.S. House of Representatives from California, California State Assembly
- Joel Broyhill, U.S. House of Representatives from Virginia
- Sherman Everett Burroughs, U.S. House of Representatives from New Hampshire, New Hampshire House of Representatives
- Laurence J. Burton, U.S. House of Representatives from Utah
- Goodloe Byron, U.S. House of Representatives from Maryland, Maryland Senate, Maryland House of Delegates
- John L. Cable, U.S. House of Representatives from Ohio
- Gordon Canfield (1926), U.S. House of Representatives from New Jersey
- Eric Cantor (1985), U.S. House of Representatives from Virginia, House Majority Leader, Virginia House of Delegates
- Lewis C. Carpenter, U.S. House of Representatives from South Carolina
- Donna Christensen, U.S. House of Representatives from the United States Virgin Islands; Chair of the Virgin Islands Democratic Party
- Gil Cisneros, U.S. House of Representatives from California, Under Secretary of Defense for Personnel and Readiness
- William H. Coleman, U.S. House of Representatives from Pennsylvania; mayor of McKeesport, Pennsylvania
- Frank Coombs, U.S. House of Representatives from California, United States Attorney for the Northern District of California, United States Minister to Japan, Speaker of the California State Assembly
- John Blaisdell Corliss, U.S. House of Representatives from Michigan
- William R. Coyle, U.S. House of Representatives from Pennsylvania
- Josiah Crudup, U.S. House of Representatives from North Carolina
- Charles F. Curry Jr., U.S. House of Representatives from California
- Ewin L. Davis, U.S. House of Representatives from Tennessee
- Martin Dies Jr., U.S. House of Representatives from Texas; co-founder and chairman of the House Committee Investigating Un-American Activities
- Donald C. Dobbins, U.S. House of Representatives from Illinois
- John James Duncan Jr., U.S. House of Representatives from Tennessee
- Neal Dunn, U.S. House of Representatives from Florida
- Clyde T. Ellis, U.S. House of Representatives from Arkansas, Arkansas Senate, Arkansas House of Representatives
- John Flynt, U.S. House of Representatives from Georgia, Georgia House of Representatives
- John H. Foster, U.S. House of Representatives from Indiana, Indiana House of Representatives
- Ralph A. Gamble, U.S. House of Representatives from New York
- Stephen Warfield Gambrill, U.S. House of Representatives from Maryland, Maryland Senate, Maryland House of Delegates
- Robert K. Goodwin, U.S. House of Representatives from Iowa; mayor of Redfield, Iowa
- Gilbert Gude, U.S. House of Representatives from Maryland, Maryland Senate, Maryland House of Delegates
- Orval Hansen, U.S. House of Representatives from Idaho, Idaho Senate, Idaho House of Representatives
- Franck R. Havenner, U.S. House of Representatives from California, San Francisco Board of Supervisors
- Brooks Hays, U.S. House of Representatives from Arkansas, President of the Southern Baptist Convention, Assistant Secretary of State for Legislative Affairs
- Erin Houchin, U.S. House of Representatives from Indiana, Indiana Senate
- George Huddleston Jr., U.S. House of Representatives from Alabama
- Merlin Hull, U.S. House of Representatives from Wisconsin, Secretary of State of Wisconsin, Speaker of the Wisconsin State Assembly
- William Y. Humphreys, U.S. House of Representatives from Mississippi
- Steve Israel (1985), U.S. House of Representatives from New York
- Sam Johnson, U.S. House of Representatives from Texas, Texas House of Representatives
- Frank M. Karsten, U.S. House of Representatives from Missouri
- Tom Kindness, U.S. House of Representatives from Ohio, Ohio House of Representatives; mayor of Hamilton, Ohio
- Robert W. Levering, U.S. House of Representatives of Ohio
- Albert F. Dawson, U.S. House of Representatives from Iowa
- Tim Mahoney (1983), U.S. House of Representatives from Florida
- Henry May, U.S. House of Representatives from Maryland
- Donald H. McLean, U.S. House of Representatives from New Jersey
- Herbert A. Meyer, U.S. House of Representatives from Kansas
- Earl C. Michener, U.S. House of Representatives from Michigan
- Edward Tylor Miller, U.S. House of Representatives from Maryland
- Tom Van Horn Moorehead, U.S. House of Representatives from Ohio, Ohio Senate, mayor of Zanesville, Ohio
- Jared Moskowitz, U.S. House of Representatives from Florida, Director of the Florida Division of Emergency Management, Florida House of Representatives
- Johnny Olszewski, U.S. House of Representatives from Maryland, Executive of Baltimore County, Maryland House of Delegates
- William H. Parker, U.S. House of Representatives from South Dakota
- Stanford Parris, U.S. House of Representatives from Virginia, Virginia House of Delegates
- James T. Patterson, U.S. House of Representatives from Connecticut
- Nick Rahall, U.S. House of Representatives from West Virginia
- Jim Ramstad (1973), U.S. House of Representatives from Minnesota, Minnesota Senate
- Henry S. Reuss, U.S. House of Representatives from Wisconsin
- John Merriman Reynolds, U.S. House of Representatives from Pennsylvania, Pennsylvania House of Representatives, Lieutenant Governor of Pennsylvania
- John M. Robsion Jr., U.S. House of Representatives from Kentucky
- Paul Rogers, U.S. House of Representatives from Florida
- Alvah Sabin, U.S. House of Representatives from Vermont, Secretary of State of Vermont, Vermont House of Representatives
- Keith Sebelius, U.S. House of Representatives from Kansas; Kansas Senate; mayor of Norton, Kansas
- James Shannon, U.S. House of Representatives from Massachusetts, Attorney General of Massachusetts
- Joe Skubitz, U.S. House of Representatives from Kansas
- Darren Soto, U.S. representative from Florida, Florida Senate, Florida House of Representatives
- Gladys Spellman, U.S. House of Representatives from Maryland
- Frederick P. Stanton, U.S. House of Representatives from Tennessee, Secretary of Kansas Territory, Acting Governor of Kansas Territory
- Cliff Stearns (1963), U.S. House of Representatives from Florida
- William Timmons, U.S. representative from South Carolina, South Carolina Senate
- Jill Tokuda, U.S. House of Representatives from Hawaii, Hawaii Senate
- E. S. Johnny Walker, U.S. House of Representatives from New Mexico, New Mexico Commissioner of Public Lands, New Mexico House of Representatives
- Francis E. Walter, U.S. House of Representatives of Pennsylvania
- Elton Watkins, U.S. House of Representatives from Oregon
- Guilford Wiley Wells, U.S. House of Representatives from Mississippi
- Robert Wexler (1985), U.S. House of Representatives from Florida, Florida Senate
- Kenneth S. Wherry, U.S. House of Representatives from Nebraska; Nebraska State Senatel mayor of Pawnee City, Nebraska
- Compton I. White Jr., U.S. House of Representatives of Idaho; mayor of Clark Fork, Idaho
- Susan Wild, U.S. representative from Pennsylvania
- Earle D. Willey, U.S. House of Representatives from Delaware

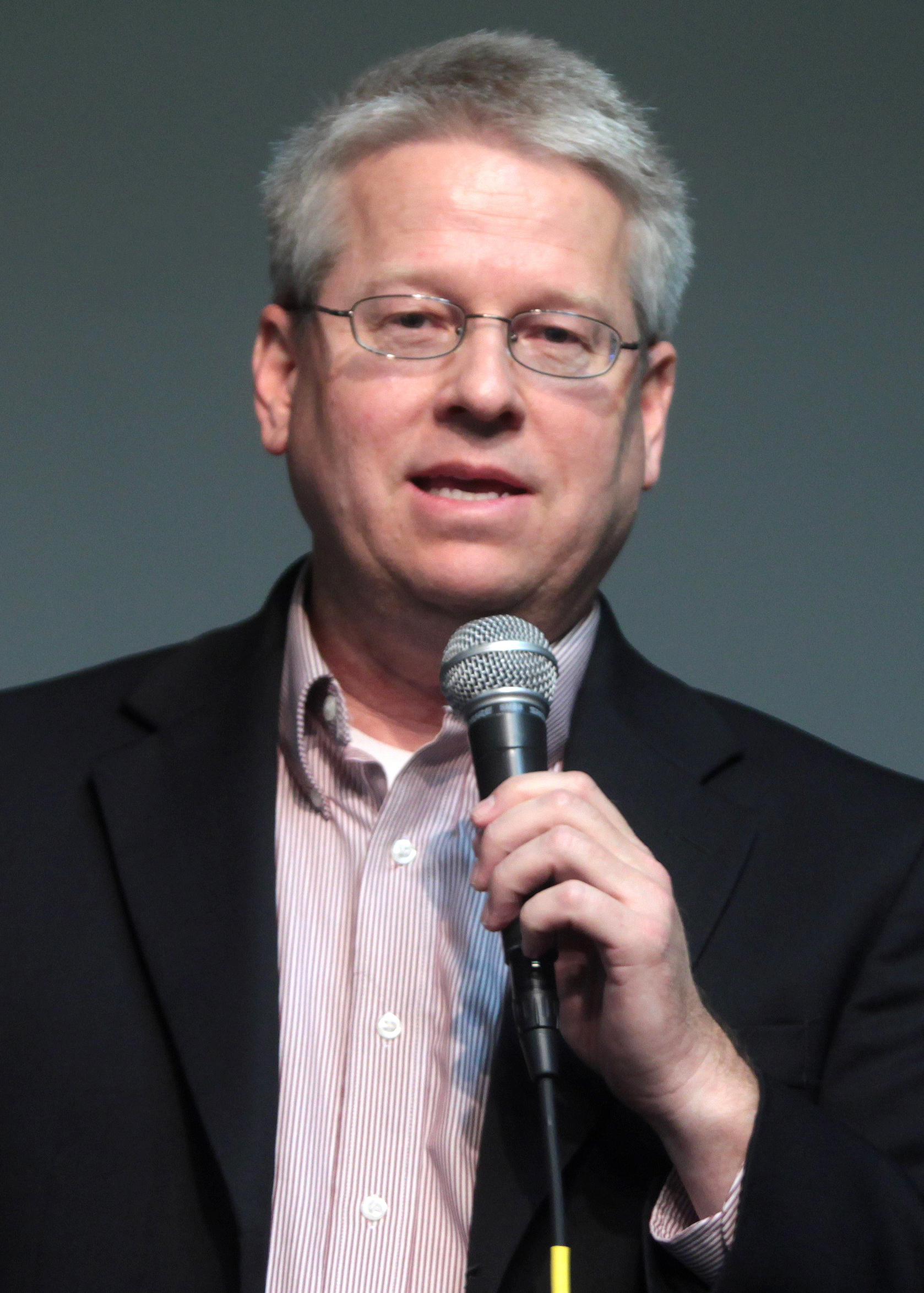
Eddie Farnsworth

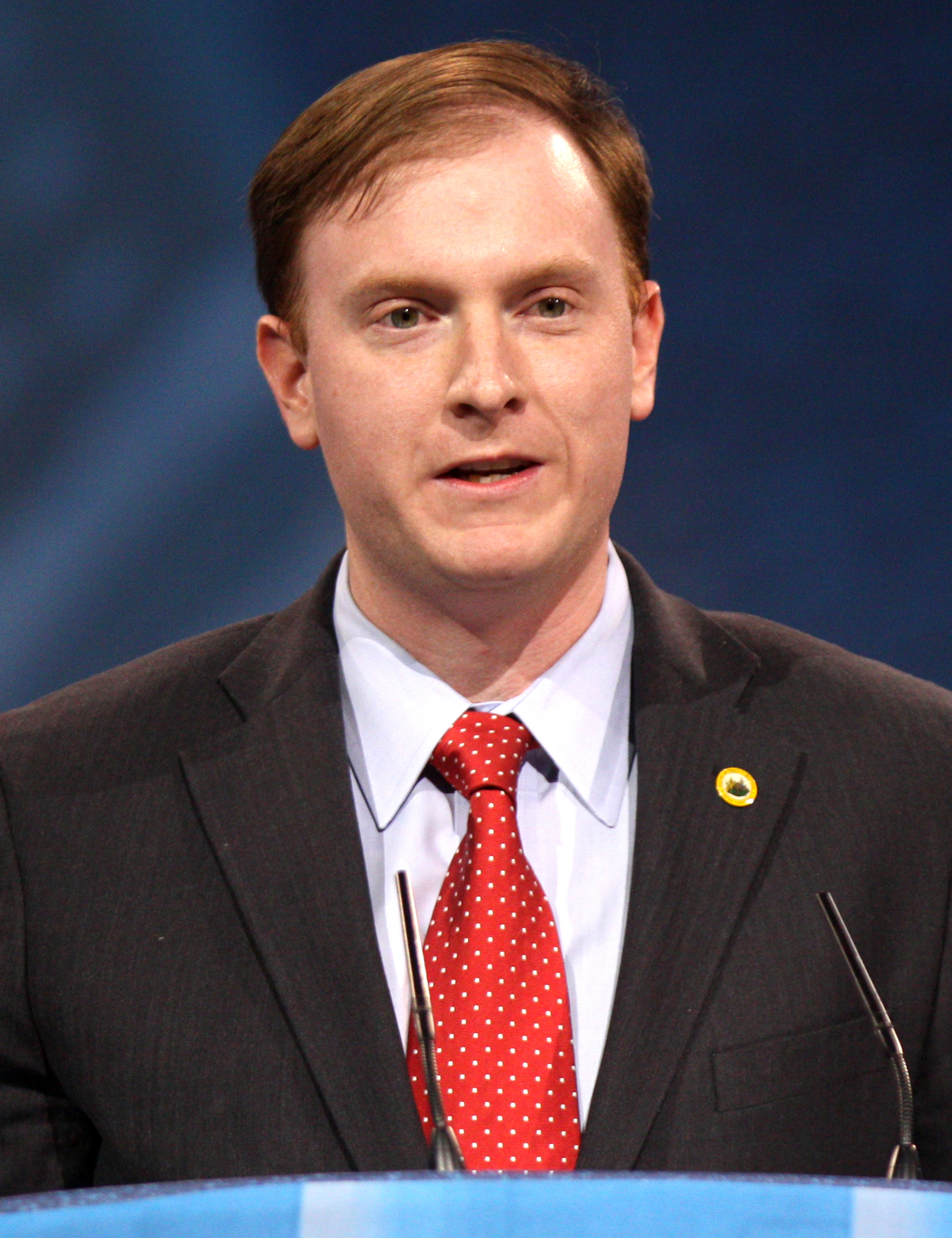
JB McCuskey

==== U.S. governors ====
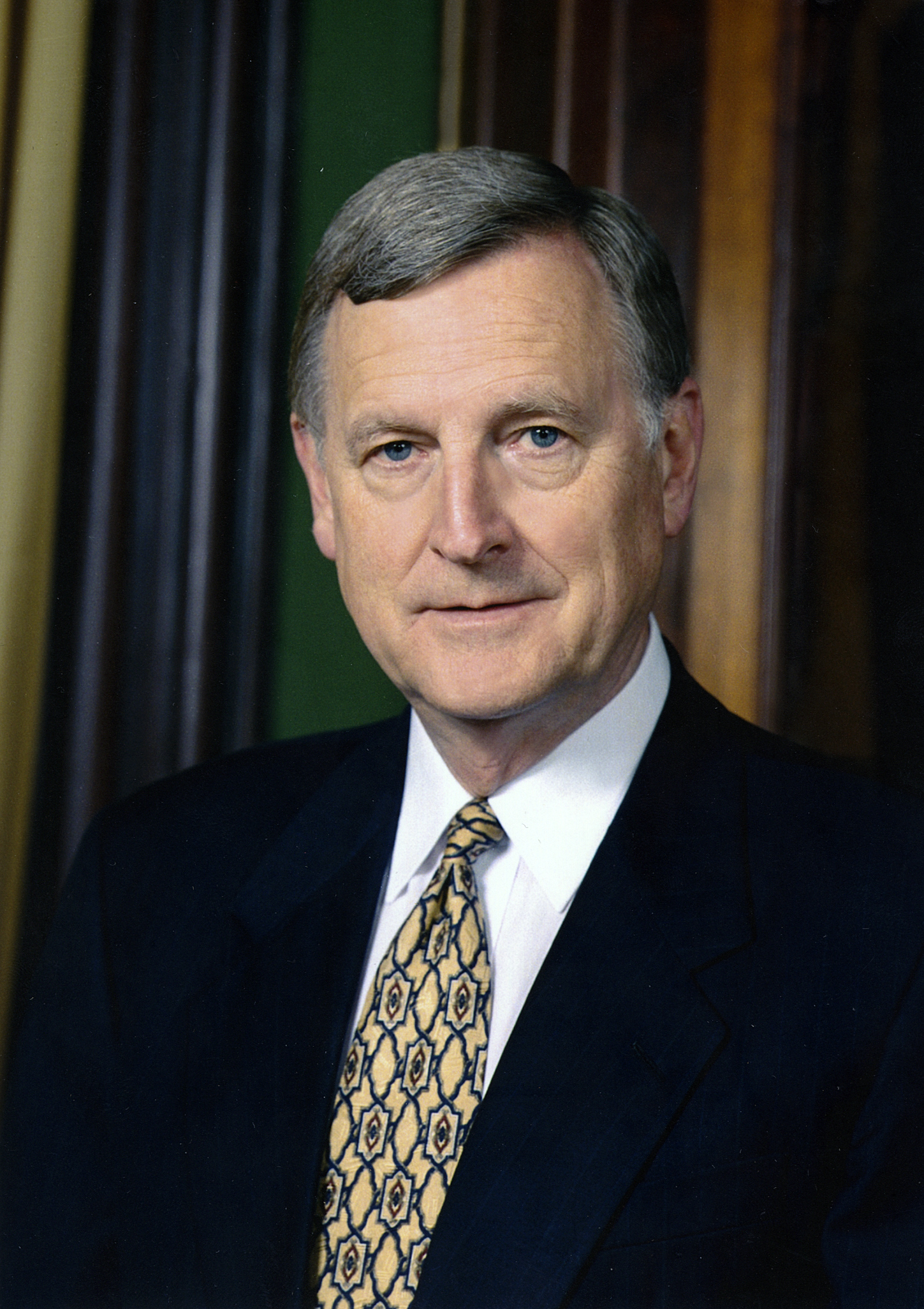
Mel Carnahan

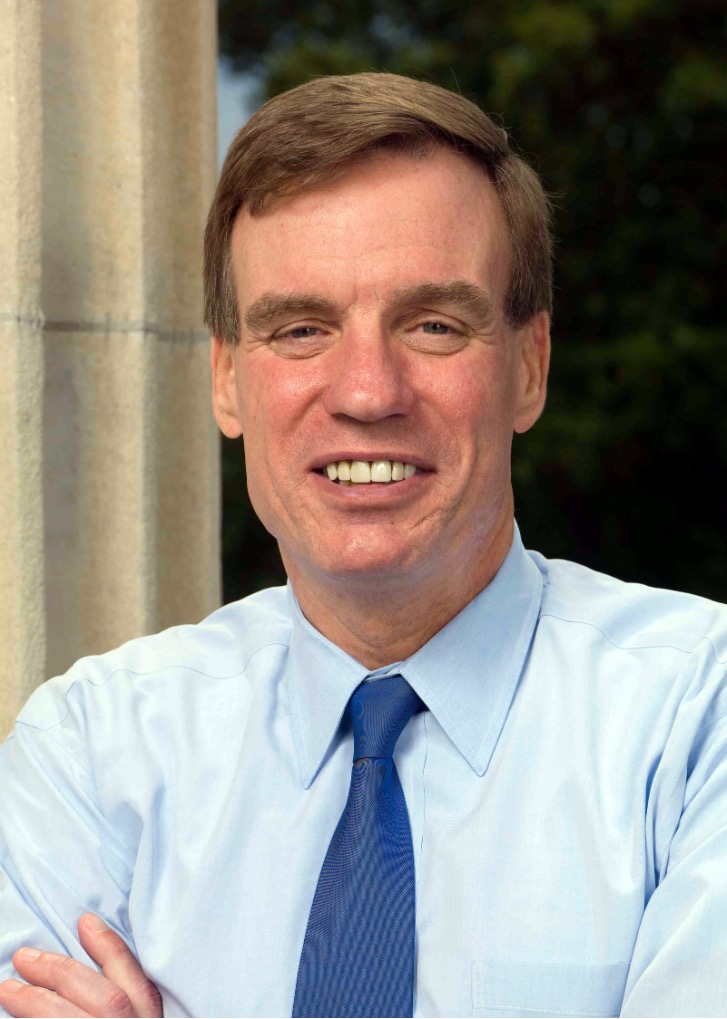
Mark Warner

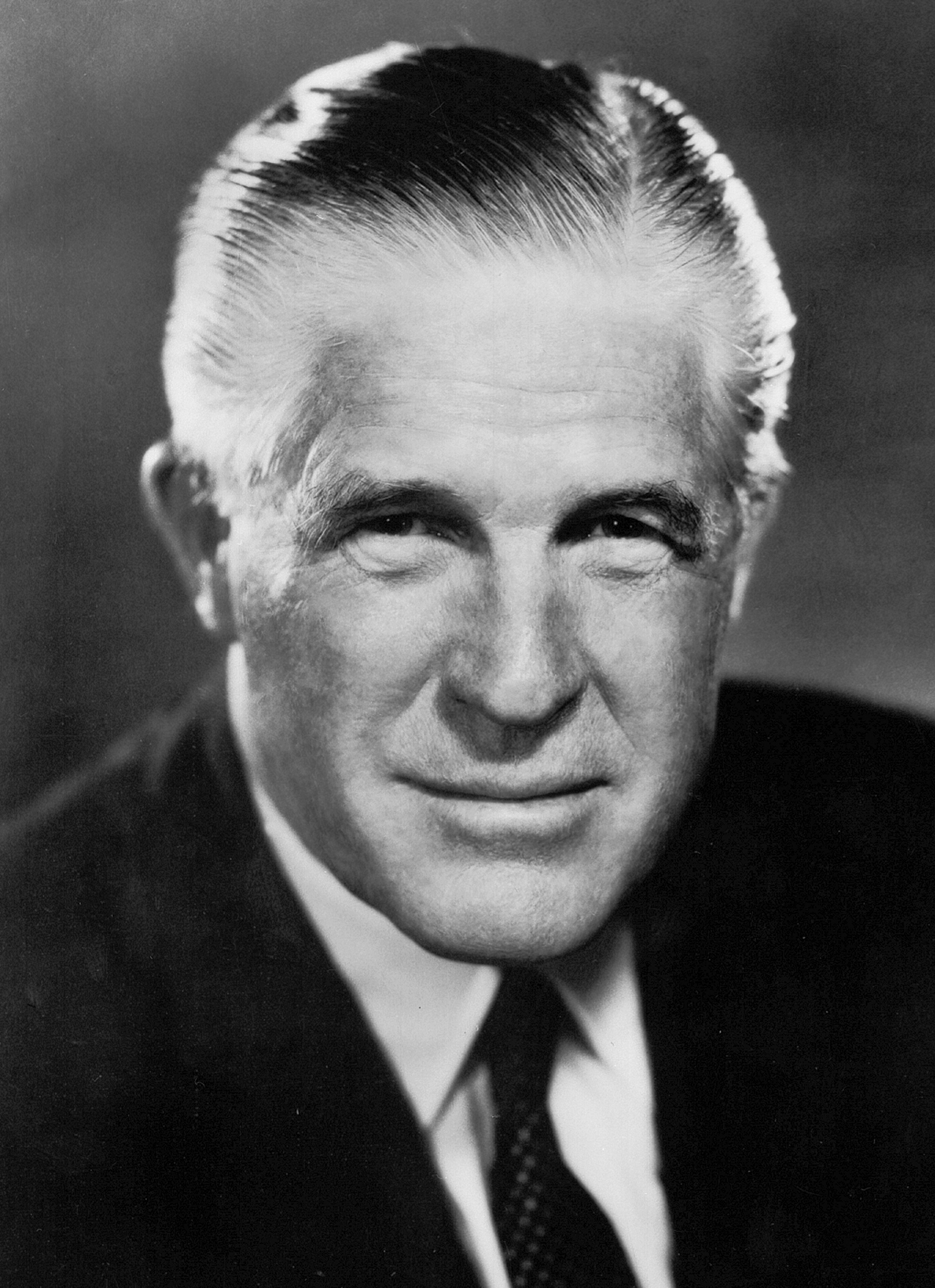
George W. Romney

- Mel Carnahan, Governor of Missouri, Lieutenant Governor of Missouri, Treasurer of Missouri, Missouri House of Representatives, posthumously elected to the United States Senate
- Bob Casey Sr., Governor of Pennsylvania, Auditor General of Pennsylvania, Pennsylvania Senate
- Fenimore Chatterton, Governor of Wyoming, Secretary of State of Wyoming, Wyoming State Legislature
- James P. Coleman, Governor of Mississippi, Mississippi Attorney General, Chief Judge of the United States Court of Appeals for the Fifth Circuit
- Lee E. Emerson, Governor of Vermont, Lieutenant Governor of Vermont, President pro tempore of the Vermont Senate, Speaker of the Vermont House of Representatives
- Jim Folsom, Governor of Alabama
- Frank Freyer, Naval Governor of Guam
- Ernest W. Gibson Jr., Governor of Vermont, United States Senator, Chief Judge of the United States District Court for the District of Vermont
- Frank L. Hagaman, Governor of Kansas, Lieutenant Governor of Kansas, Kansas House of Representatives
- Gina Hinojosa (JD 1999), Governor-Elect of Texas
- Wilford Bacon Hoggatt, Governor of District of Alaska
- Harry Hughes, Governor of Maryland, Maryland Secretary of Transportation, Maryland Senate, Maryland House of Delegates
- Ruby Laffoon, Governor of Kentucky
- Walter Philip Leber, Governor of the Panama Canal Zone
- Blair Lee III, Governor of Maryland, Lieutenant Governor of Maryland, Secretary of State of Maryland
- Adam McMullen, Governor of Nebraska, Nebraska Senate, Nebraska House of Representatives
- Culbert Olson, Governor of California, California Senate, Utah State Senate
- Frederic Hale Parkhurst, Governor of Maine, Maine Senate, Maine House of Representatives
- Pedro Pierluisi, Governor of Puerto Rico, Secretary of State of Puerto Rico, Resident Commissioner of Puerto Rico to the House, Secretary of Justice of Puerto Rico
- John Garland Pollard, Governor of Virginia, Mayor of Williamsburg, Virginia; Attorney General of Virginia
- Cal Rampton, Governor of Utah
- Grant Sawyer, Governor of Nevada
- Robert E. Smylie, Governor of Idaho, Attorney General of Idaho
- Thomas Swann, Governor of Maryland, U.S. House of Representatives, Mayor of Baltimore
- Mark Warner, Governor of Virginia, U.S. senator from Virginia

==== U.S. lieutenant governors ====
- James Taylor Ellyson, Lieutenant Governor of Virgini; mayor of Richmond; Virginia Senate
- Donna Lynne, Lieutenant Governor of Colorado

==== U.S. states and territories ====
- Julie Raque Adams, Kentucky Senate, Kentucky House of Representatives
- Willie Bailey, Mississippi House of Representatives
- Gary J. Barczak, Wisconsin State Assembly
- Bill Baroni, New Jersey Senate, New Jersey General Assembly, Deputy Executive Director of the Port Authority of New York and New Jersey
- Leroy S. Bendheim, Virginia Senate, mayor of Alexandria
- Edward Blackmon Jr., Mississippi House of Representatives
- William V. Bouic, Maryland State Senate, mayor of Rockville, Maryland
- Charlie Collins, Arkansas House of Representatives
- Bobby Cox, South Carolina House of Representatives
- Hector De La Torre, California State Assembly; mayor of South Gate, California
- Gretchen Driskell, Michigan House of Representatives; mayor of Saline, Michigan
- Randall Edwards (MBA 1990), Oregon House of Representatives, Oregon State Treasurer
- Harland E. Everson, Wisconsin State Assembly
- Eddie Farnsworth, president pro tempore of the Arizona Senate, Arizona House of Representatives
- Sean Flaherty, Maine House of Representatives
- Richard A. Flintrop, Wisconsin State Assembly
- Noel Frame, Washington House of Representatives, Washington State Senate
- Hillman Terome Frazier, Mississippi State Senate, Mississippi House of Representatives
- Robert J. Garagiola, Majority leader of the Maryland Senate
- James W. Gilchrist, Maryland House of Delegates
- Steven M. Goldman, Commissioner of the New Jersey Department of Banking and Insurance
- Bill Guffey, Wyoming House of Representatives
- Ana Sol Gutierrez, Maryland House of Delegates
- Paul Clinton Harris, Virginia House of Delegates
- Gina Hinojosa (JD 1999), Texas House of Representatives
- Elizabeth C. Hoffman, New York State Assembly; mayor of North Tonawanda, New York
- David Holt, Oklahoma Senate, mayor of Oklahoma City
- Marise James, Virgin Islands Legislature
- Raymond Johnson, Wisconsin State Senate
- Rod Johnston, Wisconsin Senate, Wisconsin State Assembly
- Susan W. Kluttz, Secretary of North Carolina Department of Natural and Cultural Resources; mayor of Salisbury, North Carolina
- Alex Knopp, Connecticut House of Representatives; Mayor of Norwalk, Connecticut
- Amy Kuhn, Maine House of Representatives
- Murray D. Levy, Maryland House of Delegates
- Frank E. Mann, Virginia House of Delegates, mayor of Alexandria
- Mari Manoogian, Michigan House of Representatives
- Jesse Martineau, New Hampshire House of Representatives
- Karen S. Montgomery, Maryland Senate
- Daniel J. O'Donnell, New York State Assembly
- Leslie Osterman (1991), Kansas House of Representatives
- John Overington, Speaker of the West Virginia House of Delegates
- Teena Piccione, North Carolina Secretary of Information Technology
- Jeffrey Piccola, Pennsylvania State Senate, Pennsylvania House of Representatives
- Paul G. Pinsky, Maryland State Senate, Maryland House of Delegates, Director of the Maryland Energy Administration
- Skip Priest, Washington House of Representatives; mayor of Federal Way, Washington
- Atif Qarni, Virginia Secretary of Education
- Karl Rhoads, Hawaii Senate, Hawaii House of Representatives
- José R. Rodríguez, minority leader of Texas Senate
- Thomas Davis Rust, member of the Virginia House of Delegates; mayor of Herndon, Virginia
- Daniel Shagoury (M.A. 1987), Maine House of Representatives
- Christopher B. Shank, Maryland Senate, Maryland House of Delegates
- Caroline Simmons, Connecticut House of Representatives, Mayor of Stamford, Connecticut
- Vivian V. Simpson, Secretary of State of Maryland
- James Skoufis, New York State Senate, New York State Assembly
- Ben Stevens, president of the Alaska State Senate, chief of staff to the Governor of Alaska
- Colin Van Ostern, New Hampshire Executive Council
- Lauren Vaughan, Secretary of the District of Columbia
- Ram Villivalam, Illinois Senate
- Joe Vogel, Maryland House of Delegates
- Rob Wagner, President of the Oregon Senate
- Leo Wardrup, Virginia House of Delegates
- Mary Margaret Whipple, Senate of Virginia

==== U.S. mayors ====
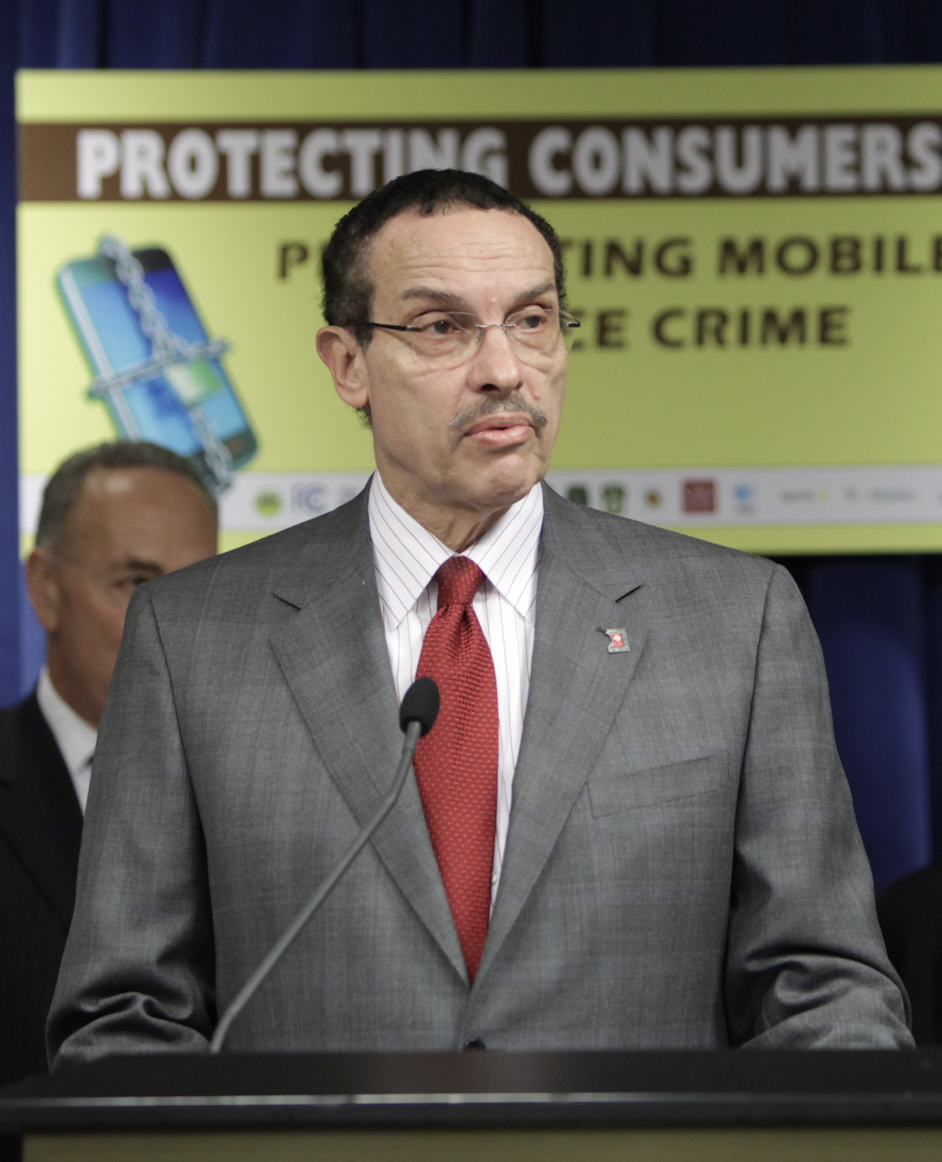
Vincent C. Gray

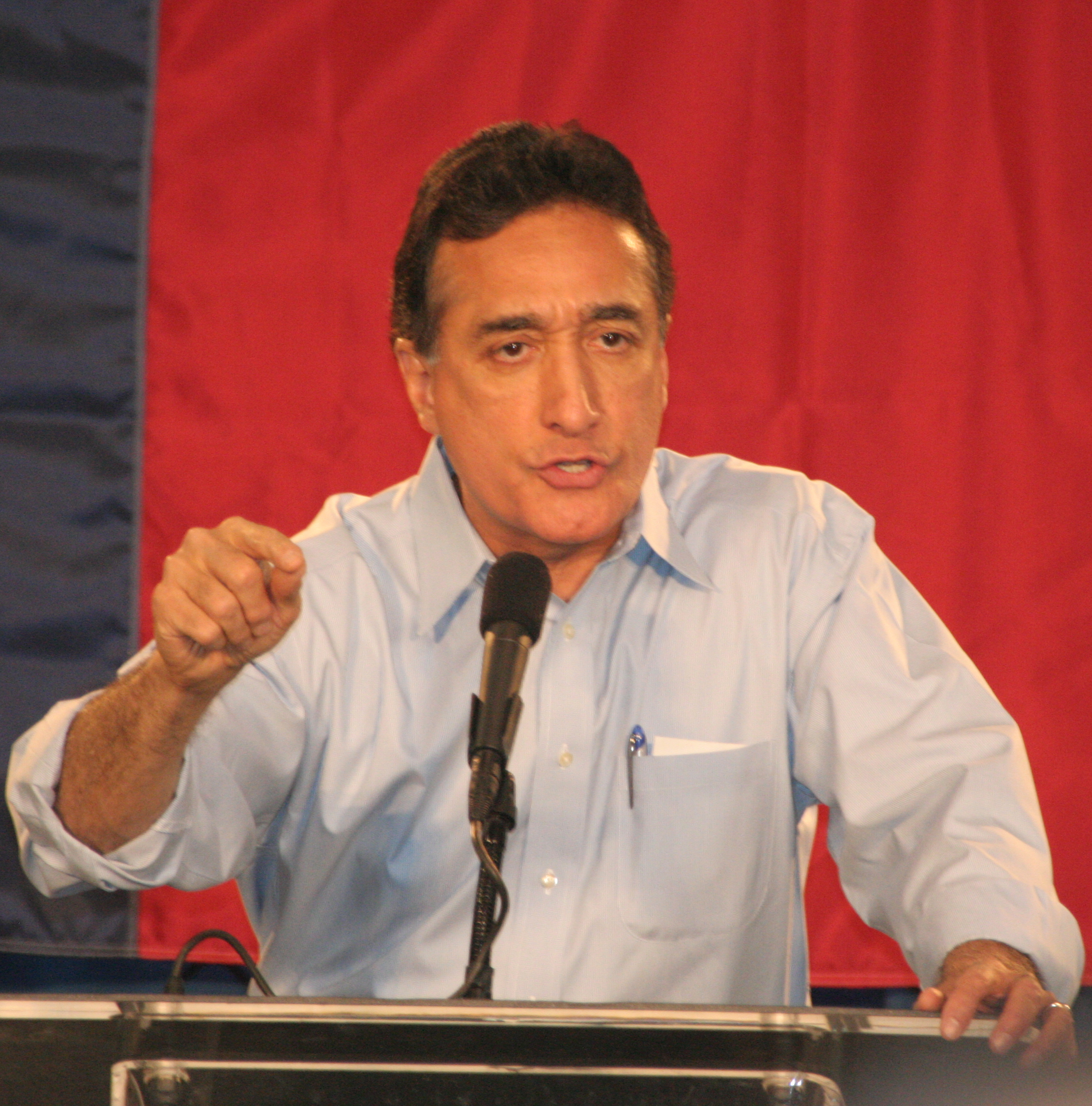
Henry Cisneros

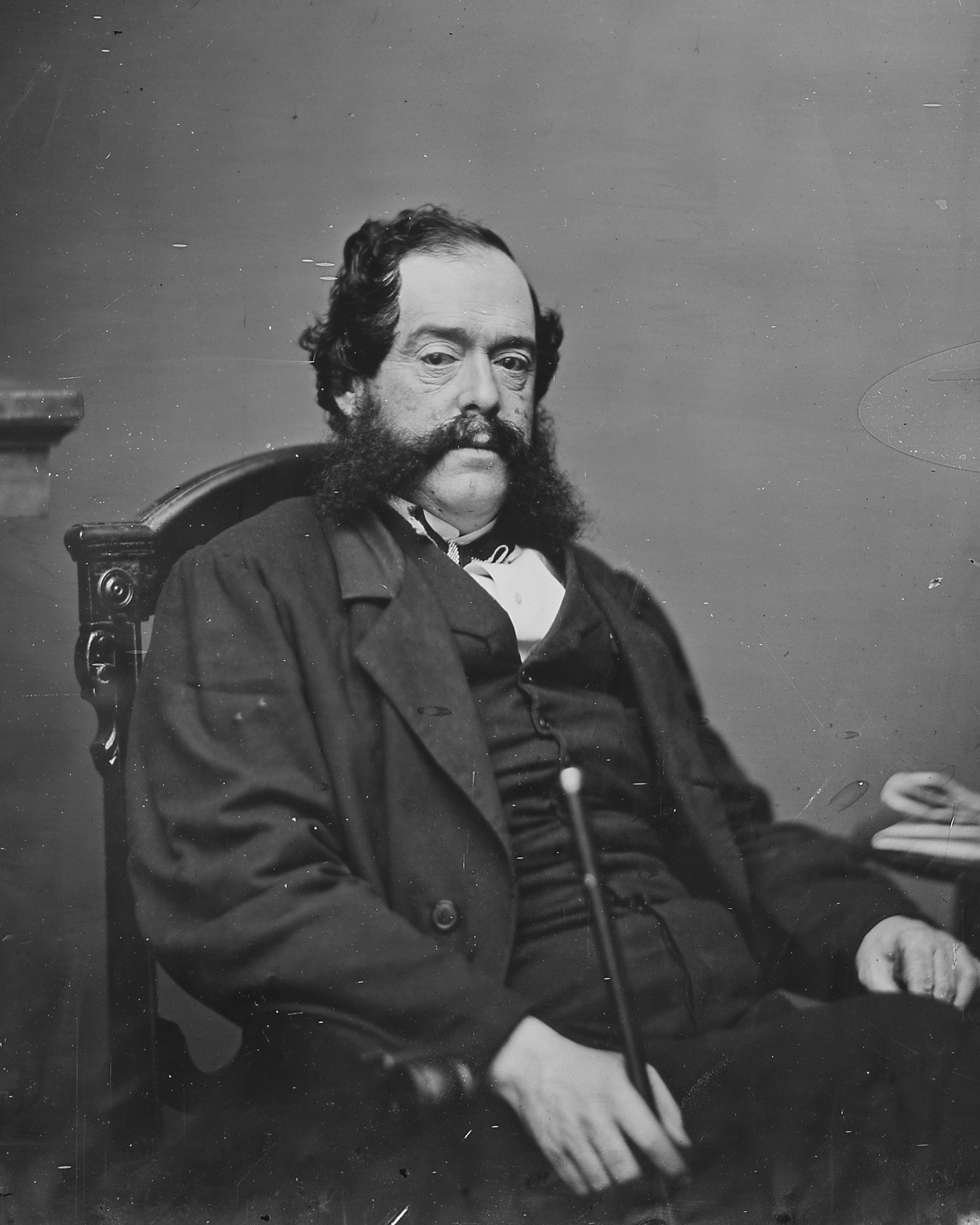
Richard Wallach

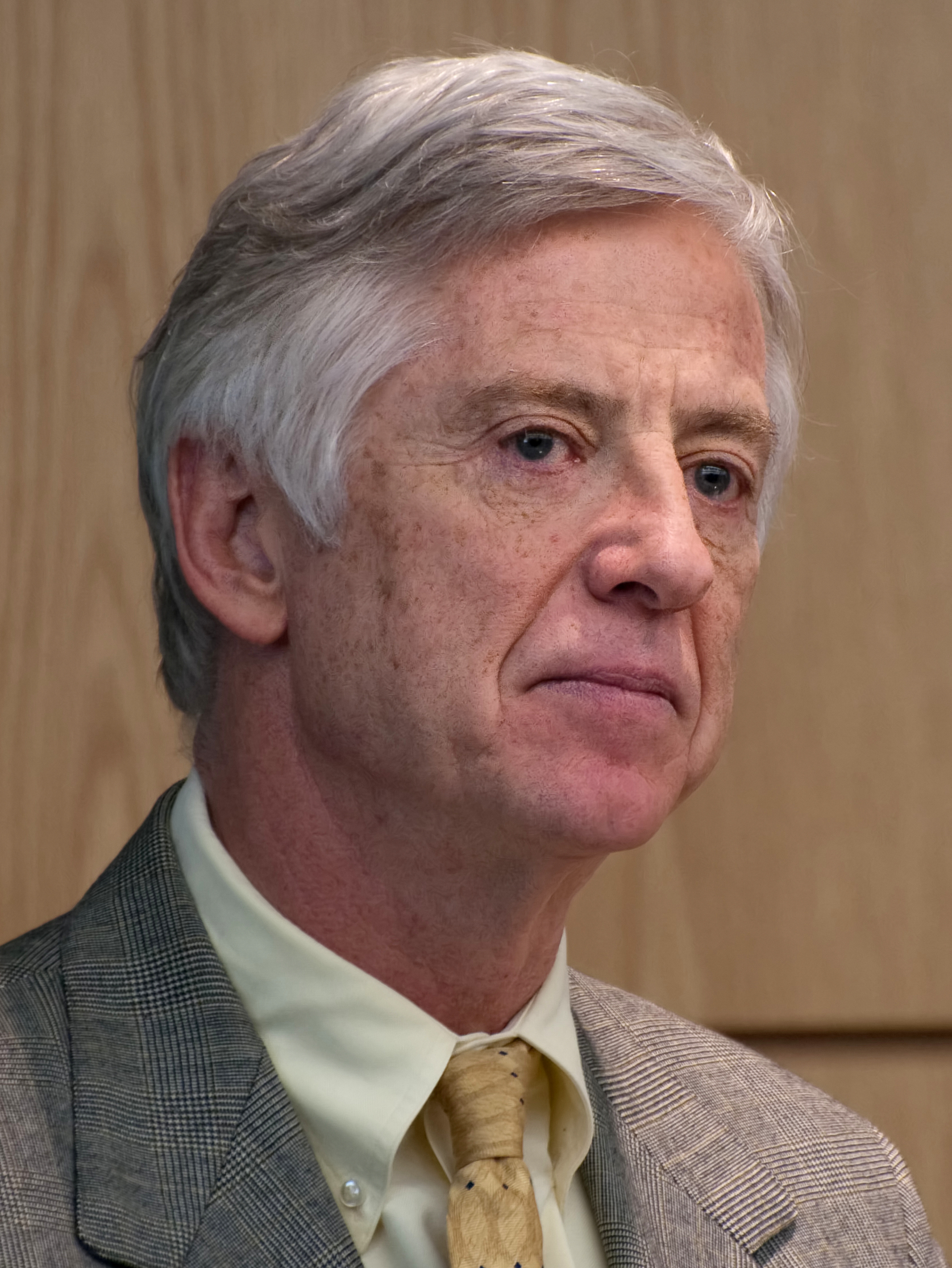
Rocky Anderson

- Steven L. Abrams, mayor of Boca Raton
- Rocky Anderson (JD 1978), mayor of Salt Lake City
- Franklin P. Backus, mayor of Alexandria; Judge, Alexandria Circuit Court
- Bill Baarsma, mayor of Tacoma
- George B. Fitch, mayor of Warrenton, Virginia
- William S. Fitzgerald, mayor of Cleveland
- Vincent C. Gray, Mayor of the District of Columbia, chair of the Council of the District of Columbia
- W. M. Holland, mayor of Dallas
- Corey Johnson, New York City Council, New York City Public Advocate
- John H. Logie, mayor of Grand Rapids
- Henry Brown Floyd MacFarland, president of the Board of Commissioners of Washington, D.C.
- Scott Slifka, mayor of West Hartford, Connecticut
- John Nicholas Udall, mayor of Phoenix
- Richard Wallach, Mayor of the District of Columbia
- Dorothy Wilken, mayor of Boca Raton

==== Other U.S. ====
- Graham Platner, Democratic nominee for the 2026 US Senate election in Maine. (withdrew in 2016)
- Roger Stone, opposition research consultant for the Republican National Committee

=== International ===
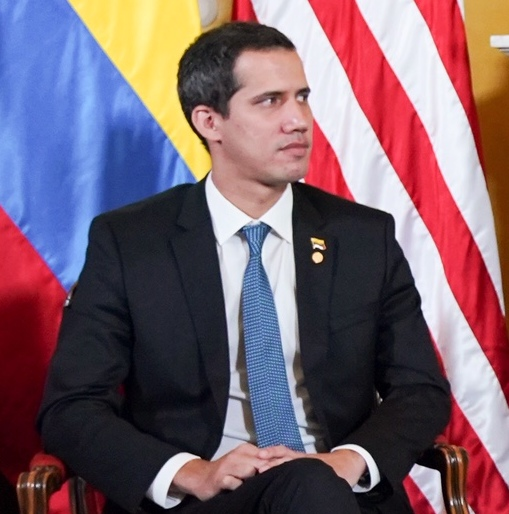
Juan Guaidó

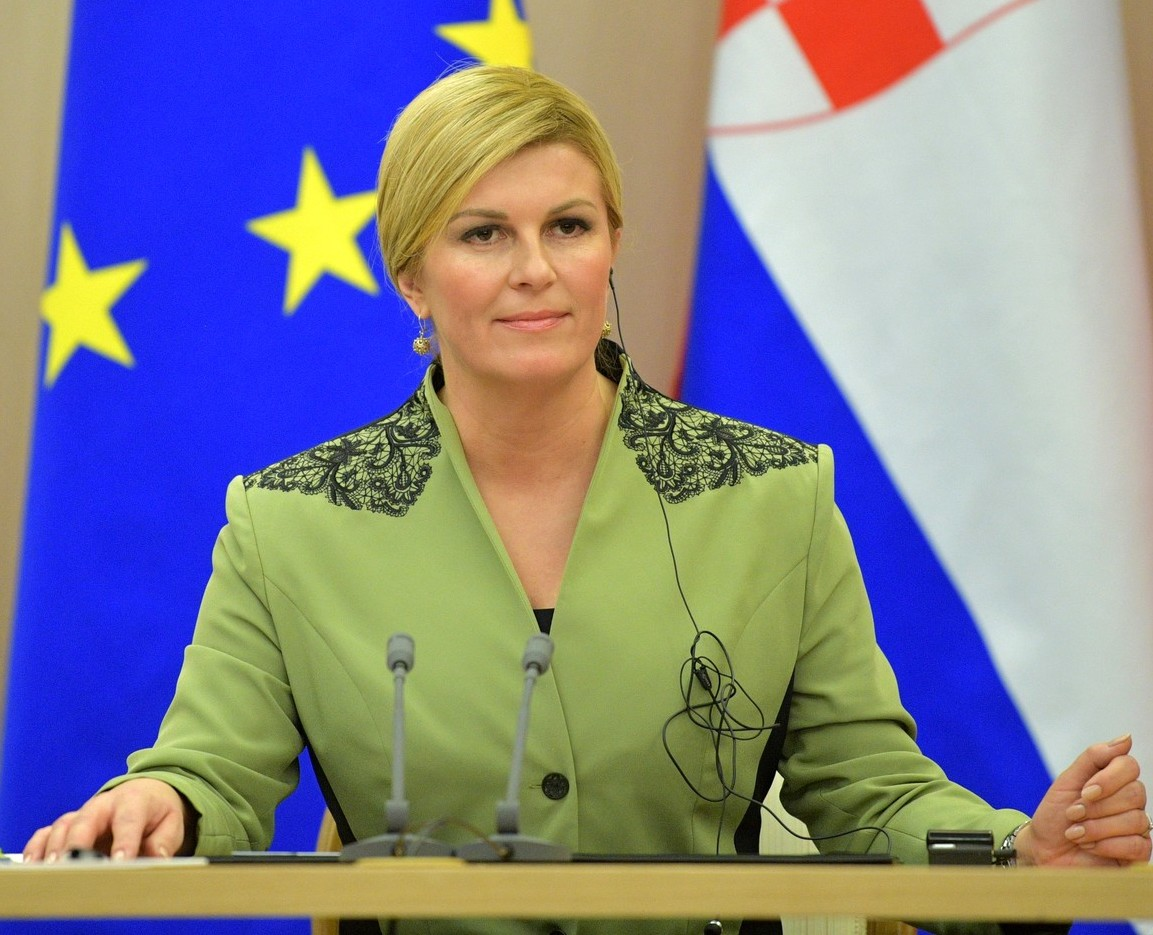
Kolinda Grabar-Kitarović

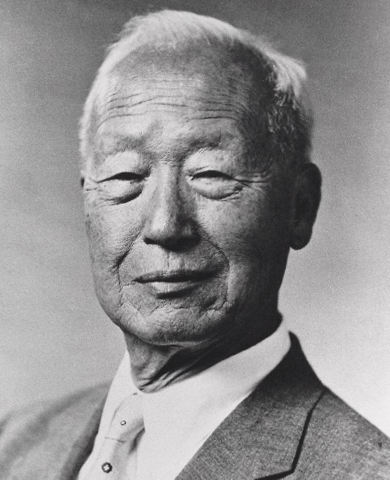
Syngman Rhee

==== Heads of state and government ====
- Shahid Khaqan Abbasi (MEA '83), Prime Minister of Pakistan
- Edward David Burt (BA '01, MS '03), Premier of Bermuda
- Chang Dae-whan (MA '76), Prime Minister of South Korea
- Michael Dunkley (MS '80), 12th Premier of Bermuda
- Faure Gnassingbé (MBA '97), President of Togo
- Kolinda Grabar-Kitarović (F.S. '03), President of Croatia
- Juan Guaidó (MPA '09), President of Venezuela
- Lee Myung-bak (V.S. '99), President of South Korea
- Mahmud Suleiman Maghribi (PhD '73), prime minister of Libya
- Syngman Rhee (BA 1907), 1st president of South Korea
- Mikhail Saakashvili (LLM '94), 3rd president of Georgia
- Chimediin Saikhanbileg (LLM '02), Prime Minister of Mongolia
- Mandé Sidibé (MBA '74), 8th Prime Minister of Mali
- Song Yo Chan (BA '40), Prime Minister of South Korea
- Tshering Wangchuk (LLM '03), interim Prime Minister of Bhutan
- Ghazi Mashal Ajil al-Yawer (MA '85), president of Iraq

==== Cabinet ministers ====
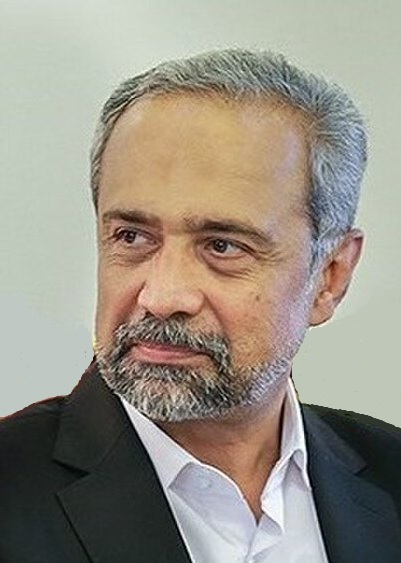
Mohammad Nahavandian

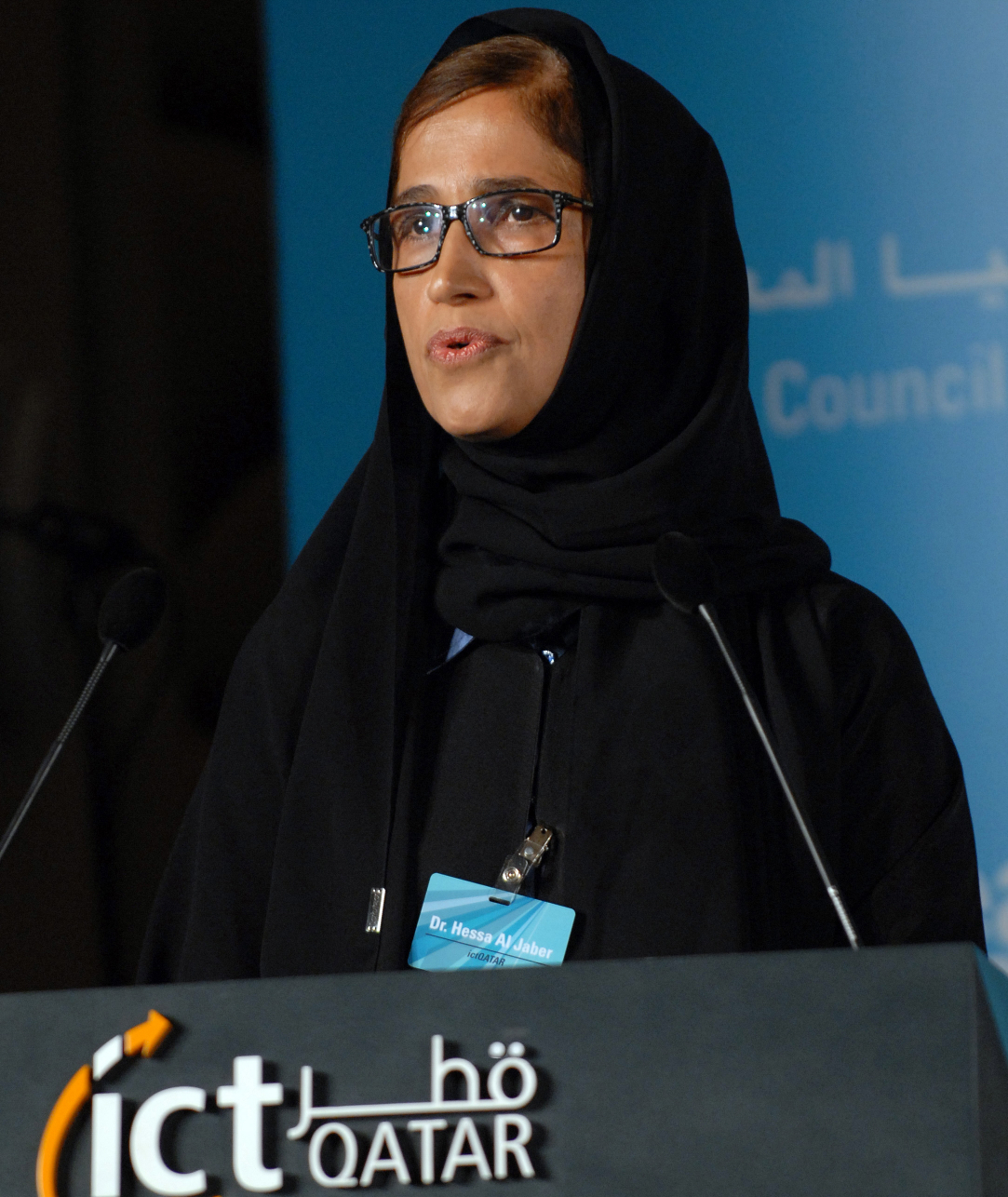
Hessa Al Jaber

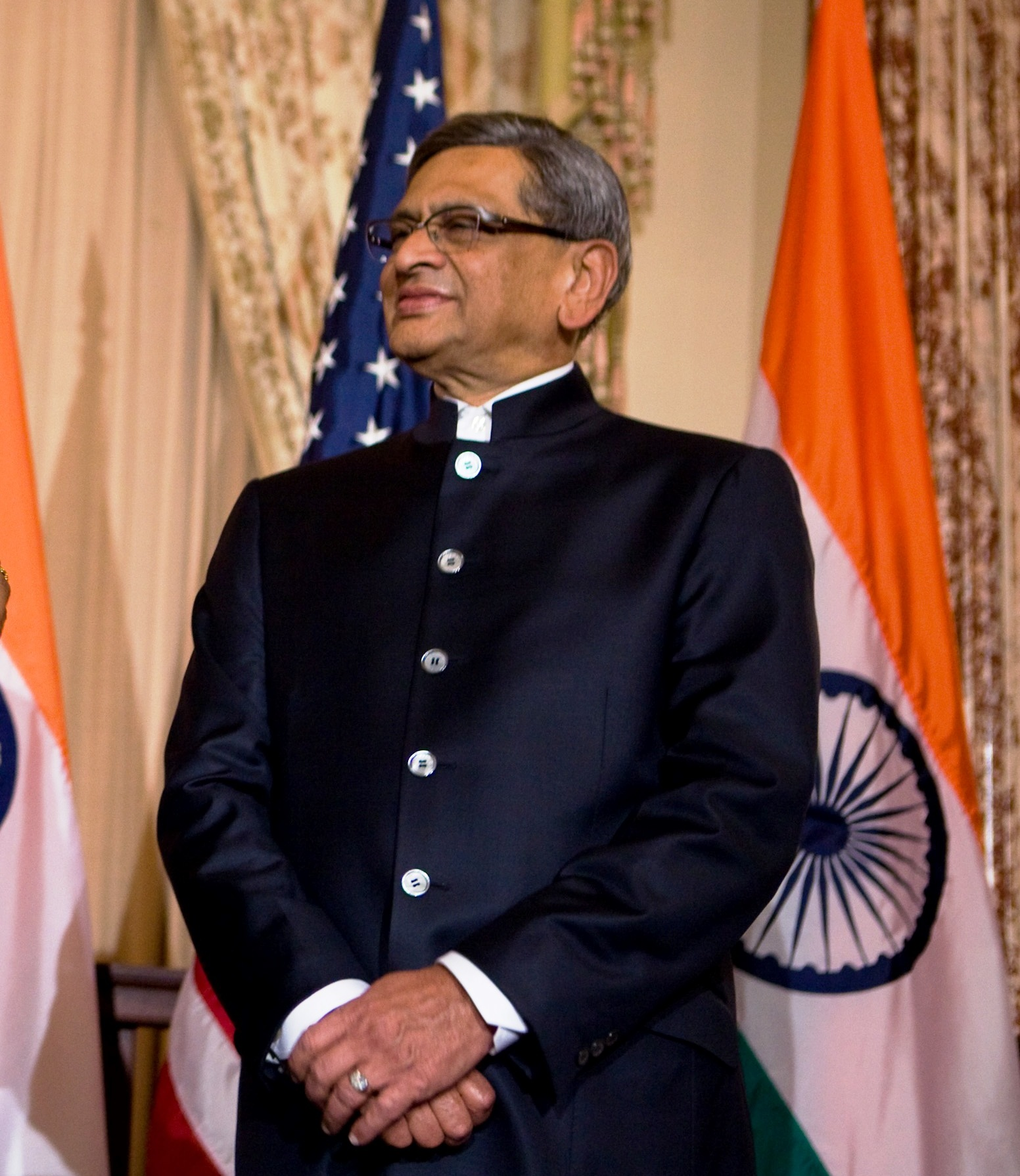
S. M. Krishna

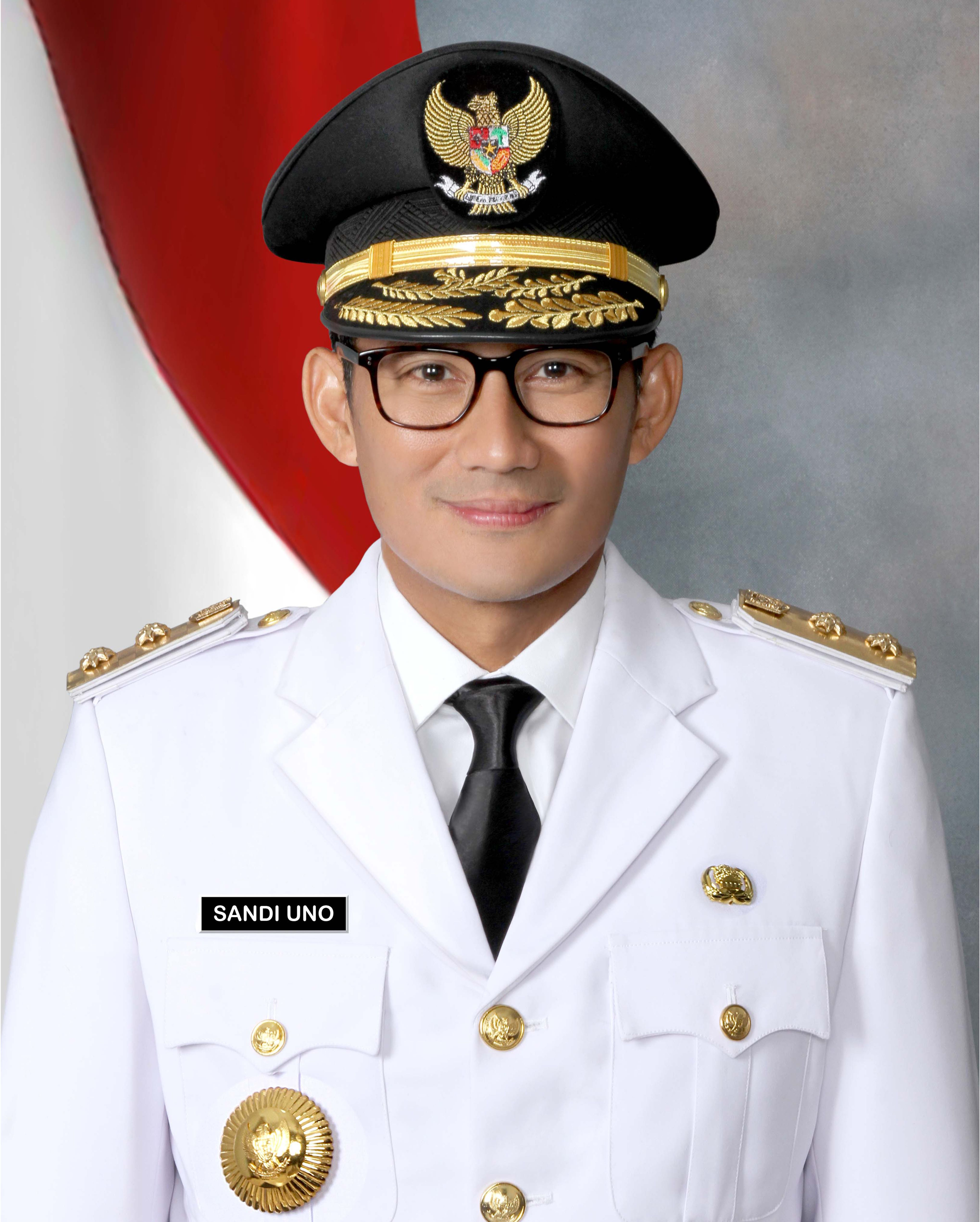
Sandiaga Salahuddin Uno

- Shahid Khaqan Abbasi, Ministry of Petroleum and Natural Resources
- Ashtar Ausaf Ali, Attorney-General for Pakistan
- Hedayat Amin Arsala, Foreign Minister of Afghanistan
- Htay Aung, Tourism Minister of Myanmar
- Alaa Batayneh, Energy Minister of Jordan
- Roberto Campos, Minister of Planning of Brazil
- John Deng, Minister without Portfolio of Taiwan
- Rex Gatchalian, Philippines secretary of Social Welfare and Development, Philippine House of Representatives from Valenzuela, mayor of Valenzuela
- Pedro Sánchez Gamarra, Energy Minister of Peru
- Raya Haffar al-Hassan, Finance Minister of Lebanon
- Hessa Al Jaber, Minister of Information of Qatar
- Aleksandre Jejelava, Science and Education Minister of Georgia
- Ali bin Abdulla Al Kaabi, Labour Minister of the United Arab Emirates
- Khatuna Kalmakhelidze, Minister of Corrections of Georgia
- Kao Su-po, Minister of Mongolian and Tibetan Affairs of Taiwan
- Omar Ayub Khan, Energy Minister of Pakistan
- Kivutha Kibwana, Defense Minister of Kenya
- Yahya Kisbi, Jordanian Minister of Public Works and Housing
- S. M. Krishna, Foreign Minister of India
- Zhivargo Laing, Culture Minister of the Bahamas
- Lee Beom Seok, Foreign Minister of South Korea
- Mihnea Motoc, Defense Minister of Romania
- Mohammad Mustafa, deputy prime minister of Palestine
- Mohammad Nahavandian, Vice President of Iran
- Nguyễn Thanh Nghị, Vietnamese Minister of Construction, head of the Central Policy and Strategy Commission of the Communist Party of Vietnam
- Luhut Binsar Pandjaitan, Minister of Maritime Affairs of Indonesia
- Farouq Qasrawi, Minister of Foreign Affairs (Jordan)
- Sérgio Paulo Rouanet, Minister of Culture (Brazil)
- Sudirman Said, Energy Minister of Indonesia
- Mansour bin Mutaib Al Saud, Minister of Municipal Affairs of Saudi Arabia
- Mohammad Nidal al-Shaar, Minister of Economy & Trade of Syria
- Nematullah Shahrani, Vice President of Afghanistan
- Joanna Shields, Baroness Shields, Minister for Internet Safety & Security of the United Kingdom
- Marcin Święcicki, Minister of Economic Relations of Poland
- Géza Teleki, Education Minister of Hungary
- Sandiaga Salahuddin Uno, Minister of Tourism and Creative Economy of Indonesia, vice governor of Jakarta, Indonesia
- Jorge Alberto Uribe, Defense Minister of Colombia
- Alexander Zaveryukha, deputy prime minister of Russia

==== Other figures ====
- HH Prince Talal Arslan, Druze leader and Head of the House of Arslan; founder and President of the Lebanese Democratic Party
- Vidar Bjørnstad, member of the Norwegian Parliament
- Pearnel Patroe Charles Jr., Minister of Foreign Affairs and Trade of Jamaica
- Chung Mong-joon, chairman of the Liberty Korea Party
- Mauricio Vila Dosal, Governor of Yucatán, Municipal President of Mérida
- Anwar Gargash, Minister of State for Foreign Affairs of the United Arab Emirates
- Kazuyuki Hamada, Vice Minister of Foreign Affairs of Japan
- Dianne Haskett, mayor of London, Ontario, Canada
- Andrew Hastie, member of the Parliament of Australia
- Philip Jaisohn, a founding father of the Korean Independence Movement
- İbrahim Kalın, director of the National Intelligence Organization of the Republic of Türkiye
- Abdul Kady Karim, 2007 candidate for president of Sierra Leone
- Najmiddin Karim, Governor of Kirkuk
- Donald Stone Macdonald, mayor of Gwangju, South Korea
- Andrew Marshall, director of the Office of Net Assessment
- Yasmine Pahlavi, princess of Persia
- Elisabeth Delatour Préval, First Lady of Haiti
- Sarah Adwoa Safo, member of the Parliament of Ghana
- Reema bint Bandar Al Saud, princess of Saudi Arabia
- Joanna Shields, Baroness Shields, member of the House of Lords
- José Julián Sidaoui, Deputy Minister of Finance of Mexico
- Johnny Wright Sol, deputy of the Legislative Assembly of El Salvador representing San Salvador
- Marcin Święcicki, mayor of Warsaw, Poland
- Sonam Dechen Wangchuck, princess of Bhutan

== Religion ==
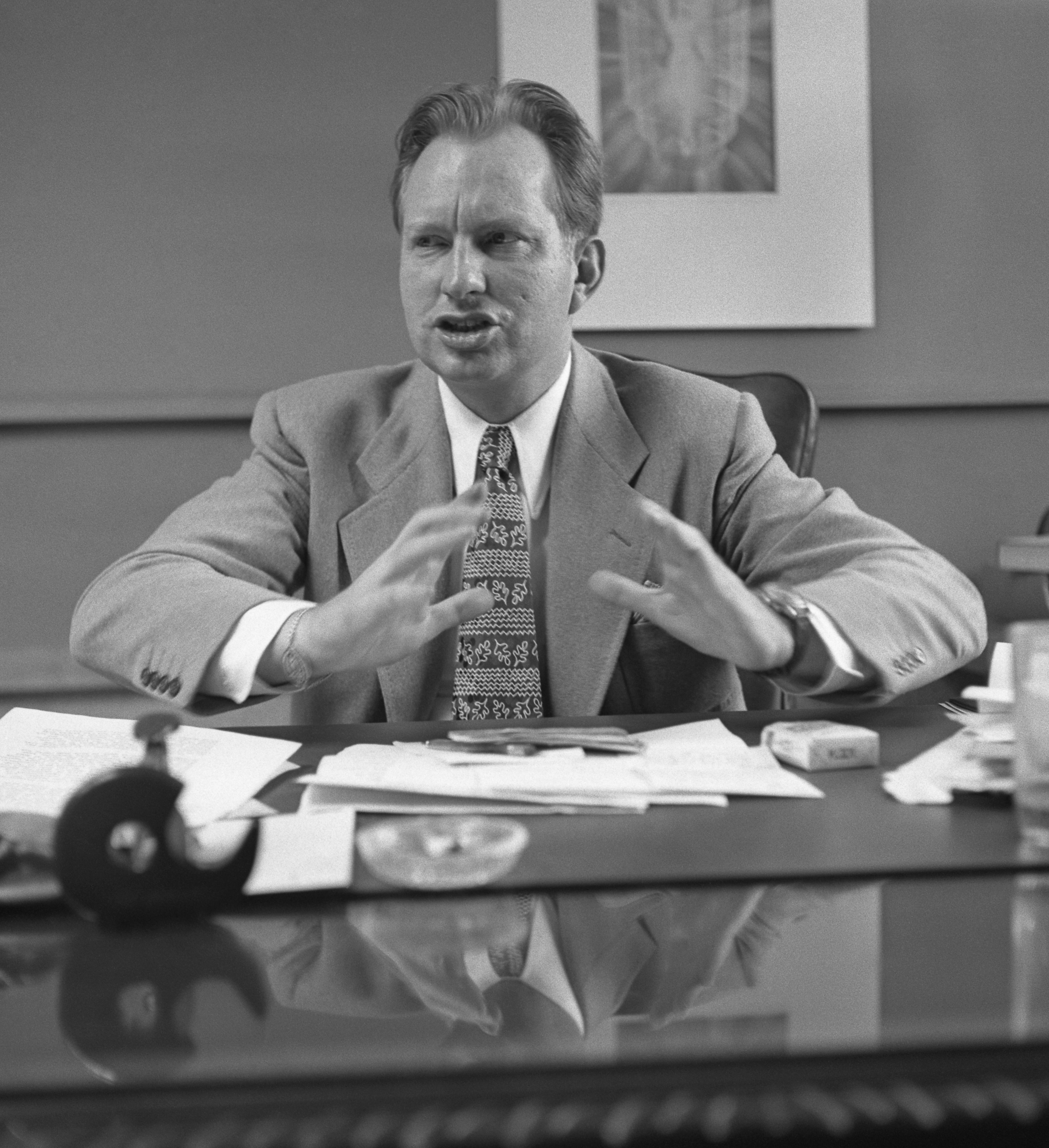
L. Ron Hubbard

- Bernard P. Brockbank, member of the First Quorum of the Seventy of the Church of Jesus Christ of Latter-day Saints
- J. Reuben Clark, member of the Quorum of the Twelve Apostles of the Church of Jesus Christ of Latter-day Saints
- Matthew Cowley, member of the Quorum of the Twelve Apostles of the Church of Jesus Christ of Latter-day Saints
- Frank Joseph Dewane, Roman Catholic Bishop of Venice, Florida
- Violet L. Fisher, bishop of the United Methodist Church
- Jonathan Hausman, rabbi of Ahavath Torah
- L. Ron Hubbard, author, founder of Scientology, and established the Church of Scientology
- George V. Murry, Roman Catholic Bishop of Youngstown
- Gregory V. Palmer, bishop of the United Methodist Church
- Richard G. Scott, member of the Quorum of the Twelve Apostles of the Church of Jesus Christ of Latter-day Saints
- Marc Stanley, chairman of the National Jewish Democratic Council
- William C. Wantland, episcopal bishop of Eau Claire

== Science and medicine ==
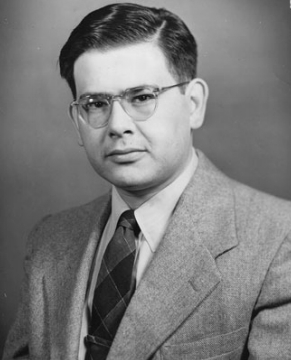
Ralph Alpher

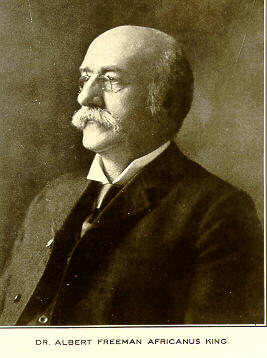
Albert Freeman Africanus King

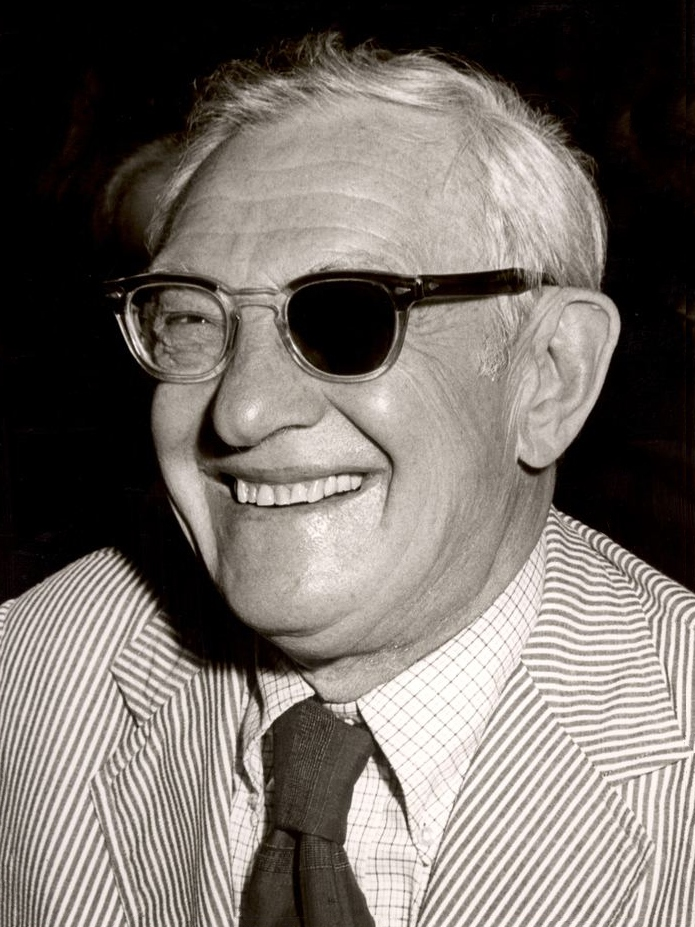
Julius Axelrod

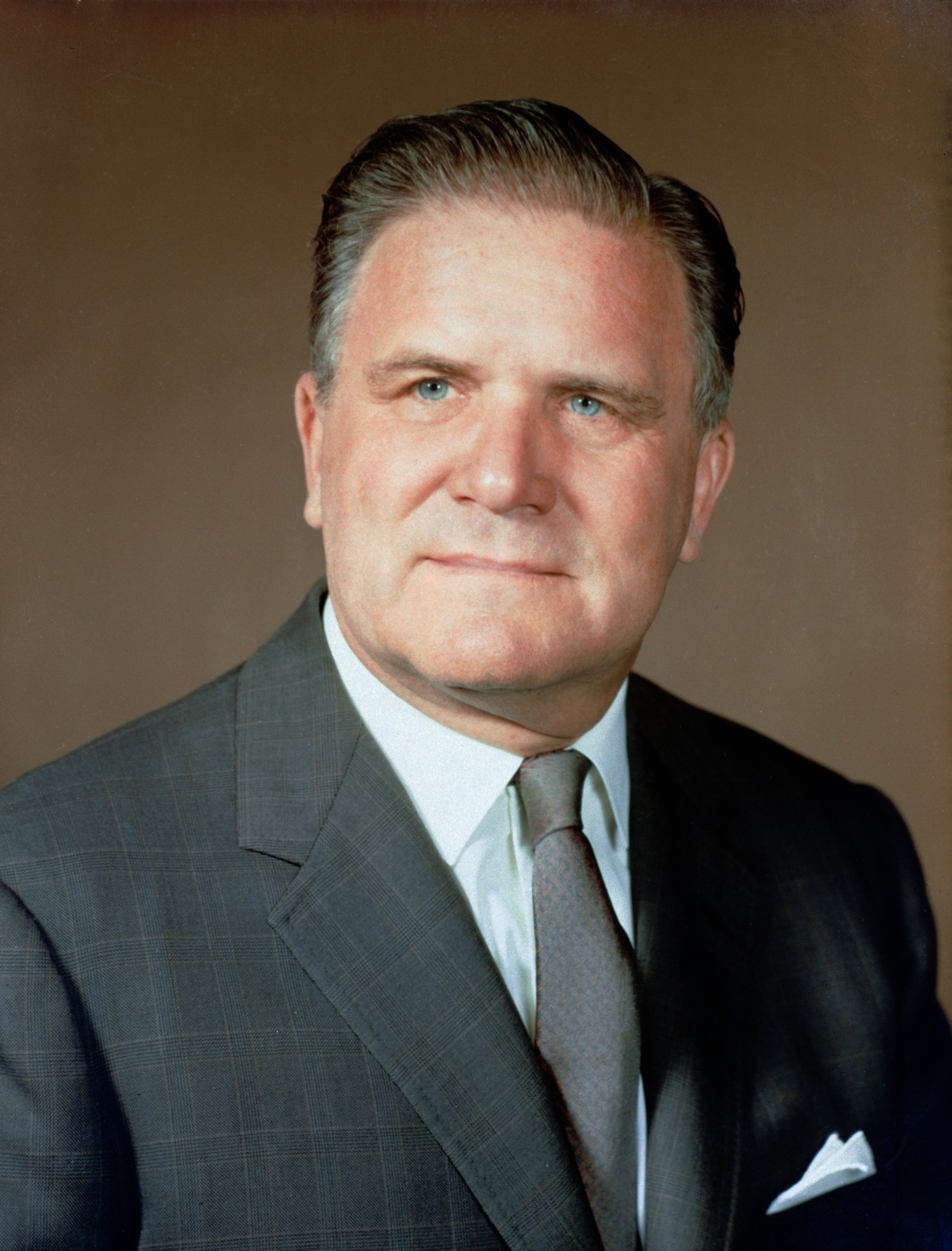
James E. Webb

- Patch Adams, physician portrayed in a 1998 movie
- Yousef Alhorr, environmentalist known for his work in the field of sustainable built environment and climate actions
- Ralph Alpher, "father of the Big Bang theory"
- Paul Antony, chief medical officer of Pharmaceutical Research and Manufacturers of America
- Serena M. Auñón, physician, engineer, and NASA astronaut
- Julius Axelrod, biochemist who won a share of the Nobel Prize in Physiology or Medicine in 1970
- Neal D. Barnard, physician, author, founding president of the Physicians Committee for Responsible Medicine
- James Carroll, president of the United States and Canadian Academy of Pathology
- Peter Caws, president of the International Society for the Systems Sciences
- Captain Michael Coats (1977), astronaut and Space Shuttle commander
- Charles Critchfield, physicist of the Manhattan Project
- Robert L. Dale, pilot for the National Science Foundation
- Lori Garver, deputy NASA administrator
- Frederick D. Gregory, interim administrator of NASA
- Michael Griffin, 11th administrator of NASA
- Nancy B. Jackson, president of the American Chemical Society
- Howard Judd, menopause expert and medical researcher
- Albert Freeman Africanus King (MD 1861), personal physician to President Abraham Lincoln
- Allenna Leonard, president of the International Society for the Systems Sciences
- Hans Lineweaver (B.A. 1930, M.A. 1933), physical chemist who developed the Lineweaver–Burk plot
- Marcus Ward Lyon Jr., president of the American Society of Mammalogists
- James Morhard, 14th deputy-administrator of NASA
- Constance Tom Noguchi, sickle cell disease researcher, NIDDK
- Wanda Peters, deputy associate administrator for Programs at NASA and member of Senior Executive Service
- Marcus Boyd Shook, physician, president of the American Society of Internal Medicine
- Matthew Stirling, ethnologist and archaeologist who discovered and excavated many pre-Columbian Mesoamerican sites
- James E. Webb, second administrator of NASA
- Ashani Weeraratna, cancer researcher
- Alexander Wetmore, ornithologist and avian paleontologist; 6th secretary of the Smithsonian Institution

== Sports ==
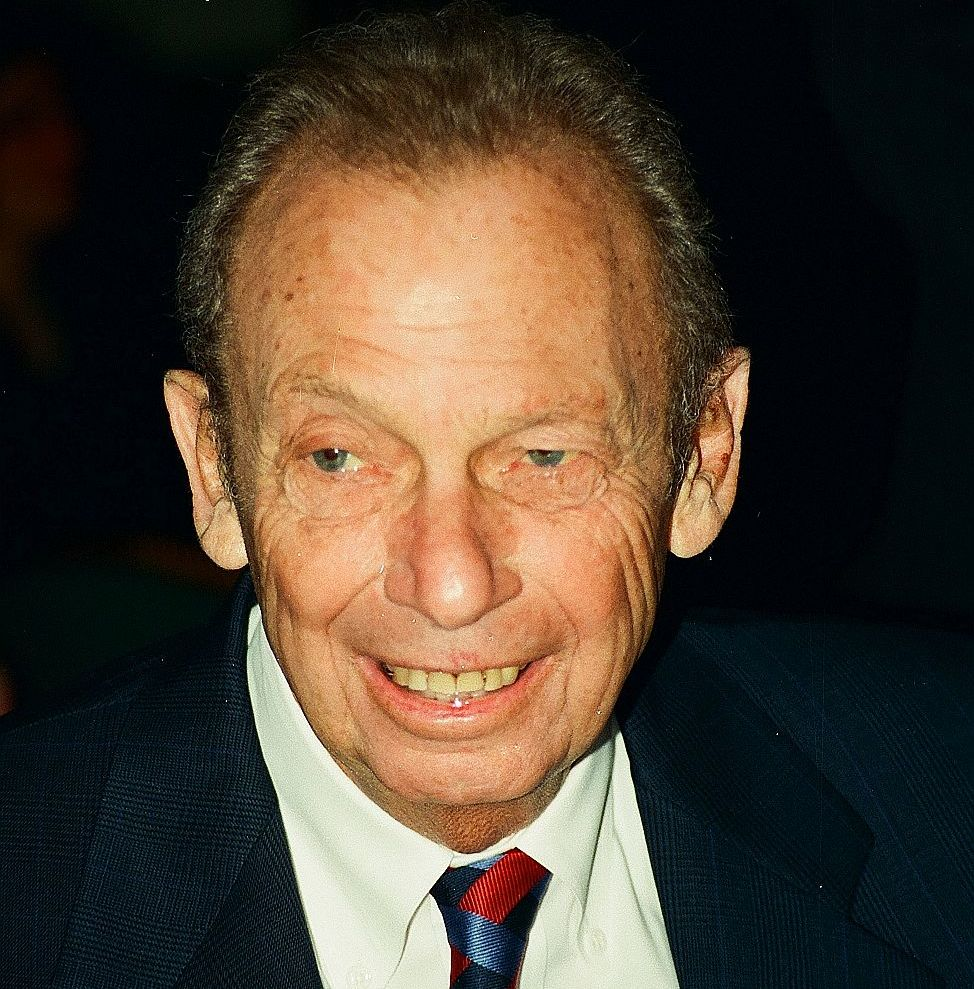
Abe Pollin

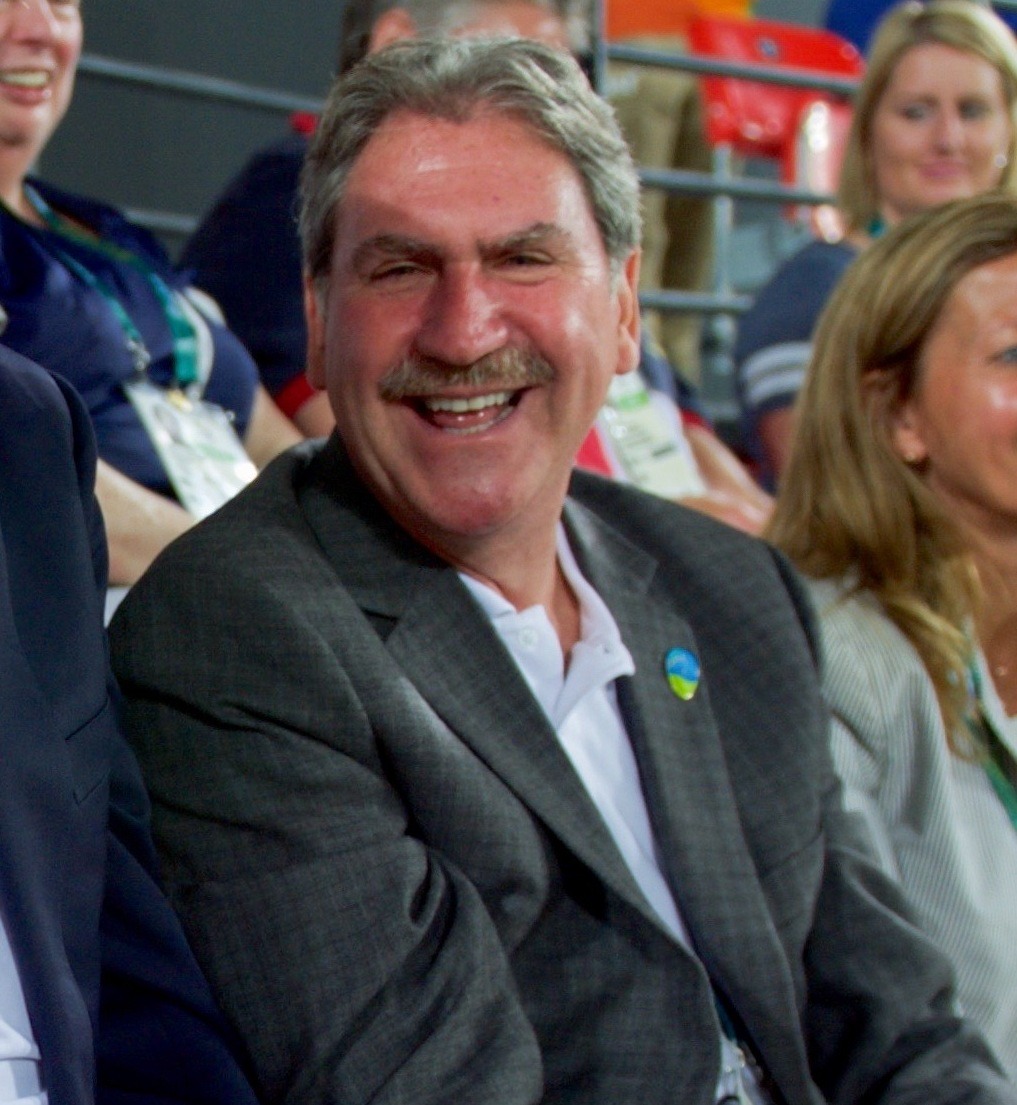
David Haggerty

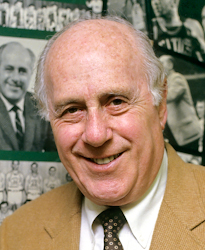
Red Auerbach

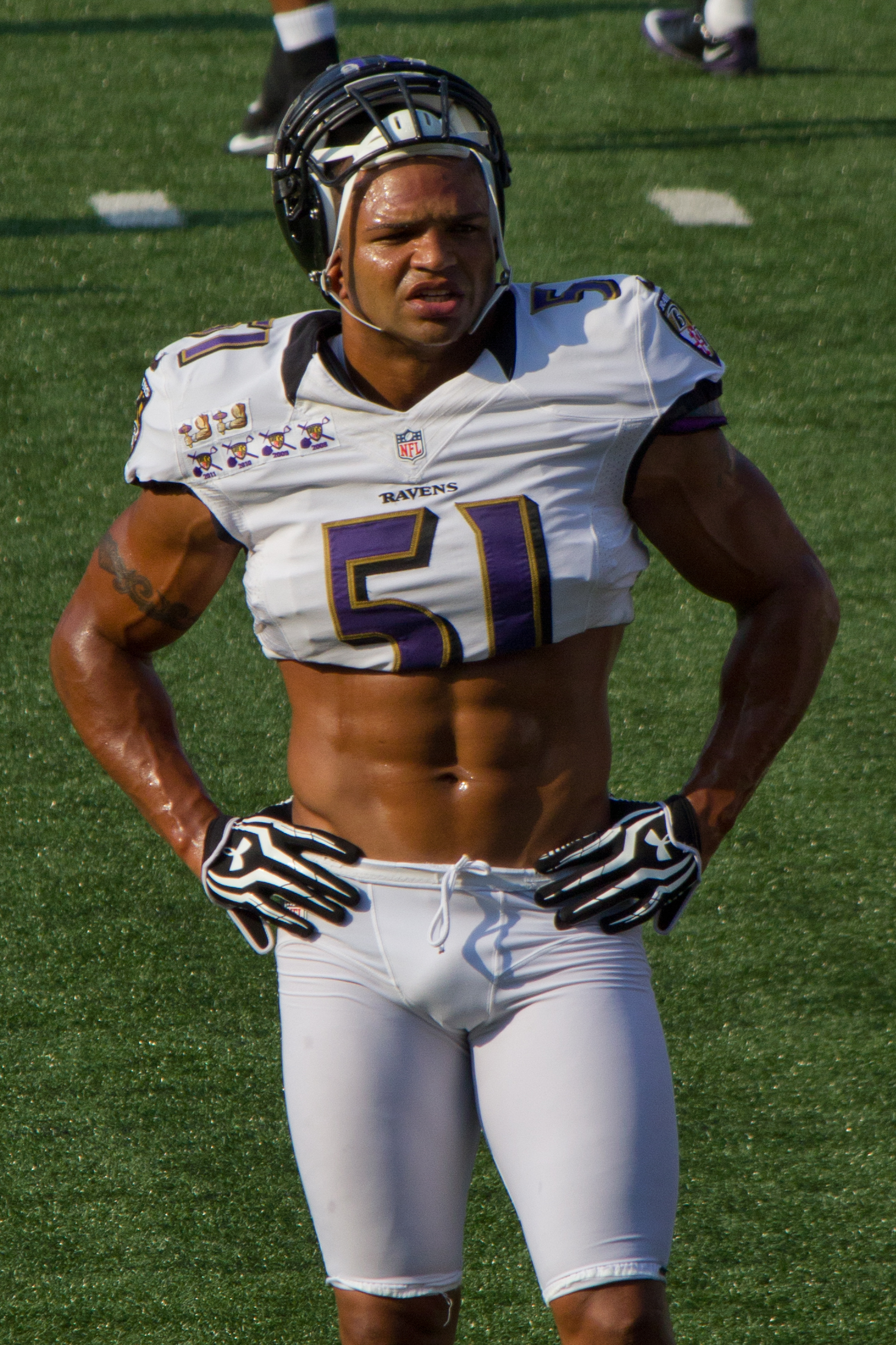
Brendon Ayanbadejo

- Brendan Adams (born 2000), professional basketball player in the Israeli Basketball Premier League
- Red Auerbach (1940, 1941), president of the Boston Celtics
- Brendon Ayanbadejo (MBA, 2013), football player, Super Bowl champion, Baltimore Ravens
- Mike Brey (1982), head coach, Notre Dame men's basketball team
- Moti Daniel (1987), Israeli, played in the Israeli Basketball Premier League and for the Israel national basketball team
- Yinka Dare (attended 1993–1994), basketball player, New Jersey Nets
- David Falk (J.D., 1975), sports agent
- John Flaherty (1988), Major League Baseball player
- David Haggerty, president of the International Tennis Federation
- Mike Hall (2006), basketball forward, Washington Wizards and overseas leagues, basketball coach
- Ray Hanken (1911–1980), football player
- Wayne Hart (1912), member of the All-South Atlantic football team for four years; coached Washington Vigilants and Clemson Agricultural College
- Jonquel Jones, WNBA player, basketball center for the Connecticut Sun, currently on the New York Liberty, 2021 WNBA MVP, 2024 WNBA champion with the New York Liberty and 2024 Finals MVP
- Lubomir Kavalek (1975), chess grandmaster
- Tuffy Leemans (1936), football running back, Pro Football Hall of Fame, New York Giants
- Ivan Leshinsky (born 1947), American-Israeli basketball player
- Theodore N. Lerner (1948), owner of the Washington Nationals
- Randy Levine (B.A., 1977), president of the New York Yankees
- Ricky Lindo (born 2000), American-Panamanian basketball player in the Israeli Basketball Premier League
- Larry MacPhail, National Baseball Hall of Fame inductee
- Pops Mensah-Bonsu (2006), basketball forward, Galatasaray S.K., NBA executive
- Ronnie Nunn, referee for the National Basketball Association
- Michael O'Connor (2002), baseball pitcher, Washington Nationals
- Sam Perlozzo (1973), manager, Baltimore Orioles; third base coach, Seattle Mariners
- J. R. Pinnock (2006), basketball guard
- Jeffrey Pollack, commissioner of the World Series of Poker
- Abe Pollin (1945), owner of the Washington Wizards and Washington Capitals
- Justin Prinstein, inaugural player in the Israel Baseball League
- Jerry Reinsdorf (1957), owner of the Chicago White Sox and Chicago Bulls
- Gregg Ritchie (1987), MLB hitting coach, Pittsburgh Pirates; head coach George Washington Colonials baseball since 2013
- Seth Rudolph, professional soccer player
- Joel Segal ('86), sports agent, 2016 "The NFL's 100 Most Important People" and Forbes' "World's Most Powerful Sports Agents"
- Chet Simmons, 1st commissioner of the United States Football League
- William W. Skinner, head football coach for University of Maryland, College Park and University of Arizona
- Mike Sommer (1958), member of a college football team, played in the NFL with the Washington Redskins, Baltimore Colts, and the Oakland Raiders
- Jim Tennant, MLB player
- Jack Toomay, Major League Baseball player
- Tom Walter, head baseball coach for Wake Forest University
- Yuta Watanabe, Japanese NBA player
- Bernie Wolfe (born 1951), NHL hockey player

=== Olympics ===
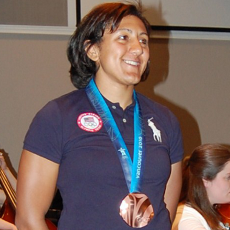
Elana Meyers

- Aquil Abdullah, rower at the 2004 Summer Olympics
- Sameera Al-Bitar, swimmer at the 2008 Summer Olympics and the 2004 Summer Olympics
- Álvaro Fortuny, swimmer at the 2004 Summer Olympics and the 2000 Summer Olympics
- Patricio Garino, basketball player at the 2016 Summer Olympics
- Josiah Henson, wrestler at the 1952 Summer Olympics
- Pops Mensah-Bonsu, basketball player at the 2012 Summer Olympics
- Elana Meyers (BS '06, MA '11), bobsledder at the 2018 Winter Olympics and 2014 Winter Olympics
- Ugo Oha, basketball player at the 2004 Summer Olympics
- Gerald F. Russell, runner at the 1940 Summer Olympics
- Alice Schmidt, runner at the 2008 Summer Olympics and 2012 Summer Olympics
- Chad Senior, pentathlete at the 2004 Summer Olympics and the 2000 Summer Olympics
- Dallas Shirley, basketball player at the 1960 Summer Olympics
- Ben Stevens, president of the 2001 Special Olympics World Winter Games

== Other ==
- Patrick O'Connell, three-star Michelin chef and owner of The Inn at Little Washington
- Jackie Ronne, Antarctic explorer; first woman to be a working member of an Antarctic expedition
