= John Frederick Pierson =

American soldier, business executive and society leader

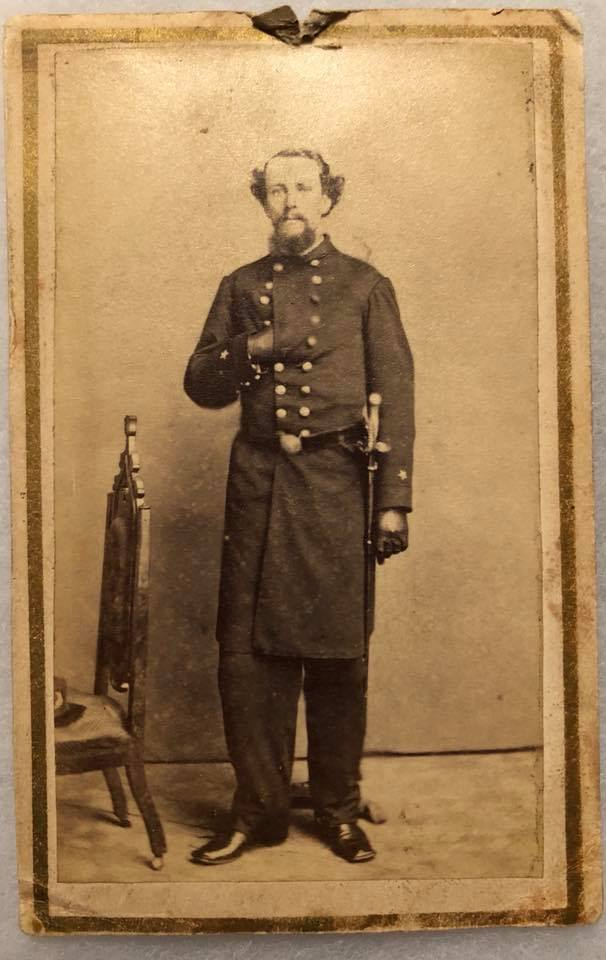
- Pierson wearing a Brigadier General's uniform, c. 1863
- Born: February 25, 1839; New York City, New York, U.S.
- Died: December 20, 1932 (aged 93); New York City, New York, U.S.
- Spouse: Susan Augusta Rhodes (m. 1869; died 1929)
- Parent(s): Henry Lewis Pierson; Helen Maria Pierson
- Relatives: Jeremiah H. Pierson (grandfather)

John Frederick Pierson (February 25, 1839 – December 20, 1932) was an American soldier, business executive, and society leader who was prominent in New York during the Gilded Age.

== Early life ==
Pierson was born on February 25, 1839, in New York City. He was the son of Henry Lewis Pierson (1807–1893) and Helen Maria (née Pierson) Pierson (1807–1845), who were cousins. Among his siblings was Helen Maria Pierson, who married William Gaston Hamilton (son of John Church Hamilton and grandson of first U.S. Treasury Secretary Alexander Hamilton), and was the grandmother of Helen Morgan Hamilton, Pierpont Morgan Hamilton, and Alexander Morgan Hamilton.

Fred, as he was known, was seventh in descent from Abraham Pierson, the first president of Yale University beginning in 1701. The first American Pierson, Abraham Pierson the Elder, came to Boston in 1639 from Yorkshire, England and helped found Southampton, New York, Stamford, Connecticut, and Newark, New Jersey. His paternal grandparents were U.S. Representative from New York Jeremiah Halsey Pierson and Sarah (née Colt) Pierson. His maternal grandparents were Isaac Pierson and Helen (née Fort) Pierson.

== Career ==
In 1857, he enlisted as a private in Company K of the 7th Regiment of the New York National Guard, and was attached to the staff of Brig. Gen. William Hall. At the start of the American Civil War, Pierson helped organize the 1st New York Volunteer Infantry Regiment, and was appointed captain in May 1861. He was promoted several times and assumed command of the regiment on October 9, 1862, with the rank of colonel. Attached to the 3rd Corps, Army of the Potomac, he led the 1st New York in actions at the Seven Days Battles, Second Manassas and the Battle of Fredericksburg. After the Battle of Chancellorsville in May 1863, Colonel Pierson was honorably discharged and mustered out on May 25, 1863. For distinguished service, he was brevetted brigadier general of the United States Volunteers for "gallant and meritorious services."

=== Later career ===
After the War ended, Pierson took up a business career, including the family business, Pierson & Co. He also served as president of the Ramapo Foundry and Wheel Works, the Ramapo Hunting and Villa Park Association, the Ramapo Manufacturing Company, the New York Association for the Protection of Game, the New York City Marble Cemetery, the A. and N. Realty Company, and the New York Stamping Company.

He also served as a trustee of the East River Savings Bank and was vice president of the Northern Dispensary.

=== Society life ===
In 1892, Pierson, his wife Susan, and their eldest daughter were all included in Ward McAllister's "Four Hundred", purported to be an index of New York's best families, published in The New York Times. Conveniently, 400 was the number of people that could fit into Mrs. Astor's ballroom. Pierson was a member of the Union Club of the City of New York, the New York Yacht Club, the Tuxedo Club, and the Army and Navy Club.

The Pierson's home in Newport, Roselawn, was built by his father-in-law, James Rhodes, in 1854. In 1929, the Piersons entertained at their home in New York by giving musicale featuring Abby Morrison Ricker, a soprano, accompanied by Mrs. Harrison Irvine.

== Personal life ==
On December 16, 1869, Pierson was married to Susan Augusta Rhodes (1844–1929) in Providence, Rhode Island. Together, they lived at 20 West 52nd Street and were the parents of:

- Marguerite "Daisy" Pierson (1870–1964), who married George Huntington Hull Jr. in 1910.
- John Fred Pierson Jr. (1872–1951), who first married Suzanne Miles. They divorced in 1928 and he married Virginia (née Land) Blanchard, granddaughter of Louisiana Supreme Court Justice Thomas Land, in 1929.
- James Rhodes Pierson (1873–1959), a Harvard graduate and president of the Ramapo Land Company and proprietor of the Pierson estate.
- Harold Pierson (1875–1879), who died young.
- Adeline Chandler Pierson (1876–1933), who married Edward Walker Scott Jr.

Pierson worked up to four days before his death at age 93 in New York City on December 20, 1932, at which point he was the oldest general of the Union Army in the civil war.

== See also ==
- List of American Civil War brevet generals (Union)
