= Jeremiah H. Pierson =

American politician (1766–1855)

Member of the U.S. House of Representatives from New York's 3rd district
- In office March 4, 1821 – March 4, 1823
- Preceded by: Caleb Tompkins
- Succeeded by: Churchill C. Cambreleng, John J. Morgan, Peter Sharpe

Personal details
- Born: Jeremiah Halsey Pierson; September 13, 1766 Newark, Province of New Jersey, British America
- Died: December 12, 1855 (aged 89) Ramapo, New York, U.S.
- Party: Democratic-Republican
- Relations: John Frederick Pierson (grandson)

Jeremiah Halsey Pierson (September 13, 1766 – December 12, 1855) was an American politician from New York.

== Life ==
Pierson was born on September 13, 1766, in Newark, Province of New Jersey in what was then British America. In 1772, Pierson and his parents moved to Richmond, Massachusetts. He attended the public schools in Richmond and Stockbridge, Massachusetts, and completed preparatory studies.

== Career ==
He studied law, was admitted to the bar, and practiced in Massachusetts.

In 1795, Pierson moved to Ramapo. He practiced law and engaged in mercantile pursuits and manufacturing. He was a Justice of the Peace from 1800 to 1811. He was an associate justice of the Rockland County Court in 1808.

Pierson was elected as a Democratic-Republican to the 17th United States Congress, holding office from December 3, 1821, to March 3, 1823. Afterwards he resumed his former business pursuits. He was largely instrumental in securing the construction of the Erie Railroad.

He was a delegate to the National Republican Convention at Baltimore in 1831.

== Personal life ==
Pierson was married to Sarah (née Colt) (1772–1820), the daughter of Jabez Colt and Sarah Elizabeth (née Mix) Colt. Together, they were the parents of:

- Elizabeth Pierson (1794–1833), who married author and educator Eleazar Lord (1788–1871).
- Josiah Gilbert Pierson (1797–1845)
- Jeremiah Halsey Pierson (1800–1851)
- Theodore Pierson (1803–1816)
- Henry Pierson (1807–1807), who died young.
- Henry Lewis Pierson (1807–1893)
- Benjamin Franklin Pierson (1811–1836)

Pierson died on December 12, 1855, in Ramapo, New York. He was buried at the Ramapo Cemetery.

=== Descendants ===
Through his son Henry Lewis Pierson, he was the grandfather of John Frederick Pierson (1839–1932), a brevet Brigadier General during the U.S. Civil War and society leader in New York and Newport during the Gilded Age, and Helen Maria Pierson, who married William Gaston Hamilton (son of John Church Hamilton and grandson of first U.S. Treasury Secretary Alexander Hamilton), and was, herself, the grandmother of Helen Morgan Hamilton, Pierpont Morgan Hamilton, and Alexander Morgan Hamilton.

U.S. House of Representatives
Preceded by Caleb Tompkins	Member of the U.S. House of Representatives from New York's 3rd congressional district 1821–1823	Succeeded by Churchill C. Cambreleng, John J. Morgan, Peter Sharpe
