= Arthur H. Woods =

American educator (1870–1942)

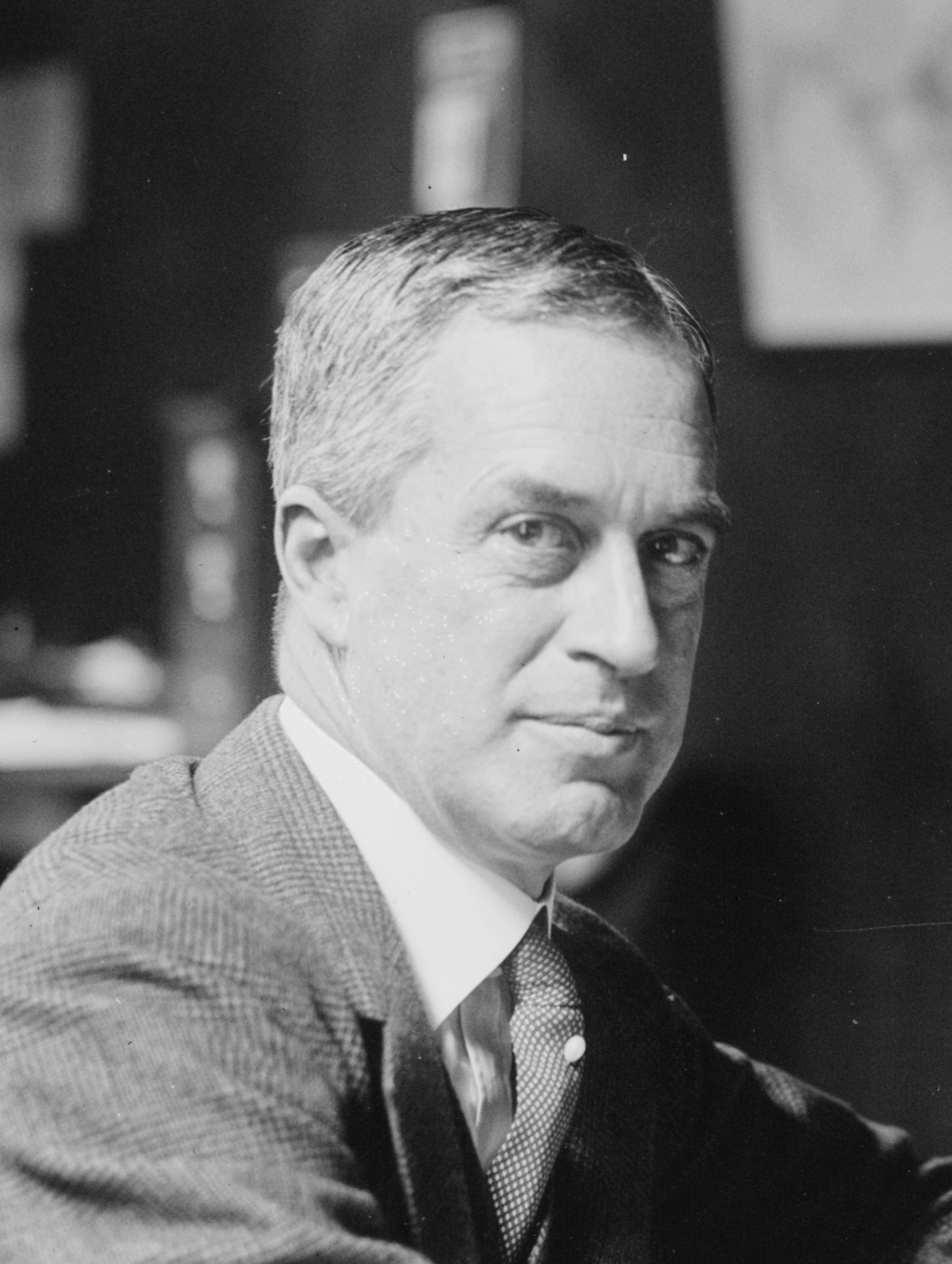
- Woods circa 1920–1930

New York City Police Commissioner
- In office 1914–1918
- Appointed by: John Purroy Mitchel
- Preceded by: Douglas Imrie McKay
- Succeeded by: Frederick Hamilton Bugher

Personal details
- Born: Arthur Hale Woods; January 29, 1870 Boston, Massachusetts, US
- Died: May 12, 1942 (aged 72) Washington, D.C., US
- Party: Republican
- Spouse: Helen Morgan Hamilton (m. 1916)
- Children: 4
- Education: Harvard University; University of Berlin; Trinity College
- Occupation: Educator, journalist, military and law enforcement officer

Arthur Hale Woods (January 29, 1870 – May 12, 1942) was an American educator, journalist, military and law enforcement officer. One of the most prominent police reformers during the early 20th century, he served as deputy New York City Police Commissioner from 1907 to 1909 and later became New York City Police Commissioner in 1914. During his time with the New York City Police Department, he was largely responsible for initiating the application of criminology and sociology in modern policing.

In his later years, Woods worked with the Division of Military Aeronautics and was involved in government committees on unemployment under the administrations of Presidents Warren G. Harding and Herbert Hoover. Woods was also an important public servant as trustee for the Board of Education and presided as president and chairman of the board of Rockefeller Center.

== Early life ==
Arthur Woods was born in Boston, Massachusetts on January 29, 1870, to Joseph Wheeler and Caroline Frances Woods. He attended Harvard University, graduating in 1892, and did his post-graduate work at Harvard and the University of Berlin. He also received a LLD degree from Trinity College, Connecticut in 1910.

== Career ==
After his post-graduate work in Berlin, he became a schoolmaster at Groton School in 1895. One of his students, Franklin D. Roosevelt, later became elected to the presidency of the United States. In 1905, he accompanied William Howard Taft, Nicholas Longworth, and Alice Roosevelt to the Philippines and then continued alone traveling the world for another year before returning to the United States.

Leaving Groton after a decade of service, his interest in sociology led him to become a reporter for the New York Evening Sun for $15 a week. He became interested in police work while working as a reporter and soon gained the attention of the Police Commissioner Theodore A. Bingham, who liked his ideas for reforming the police system, and led to his appointment as deputy police commissioner of the New York City Police Department in 1907.

Woods was responsible for instituting better police training by introducing an official police academy modeled after Scotland Yard, which taught courses on law and sociology as well as physical training. A staunch advocate of community policing, Woods believed that the common rank-and-file policeman should be in a position of social importance and public value. He also felt that the public would benefit if they were more informed of issues affecting the community and the local police precinct. As part of that system, he published the first safety booklet available to the general public.

During his time as deputy commissioner, Woods became well educated on gang related violence and was a supporter of Inspector Joseph Petrosino and the "Italian Squad", a special detectives unit which combated organized crime in Italian-American neighborhoods. He was partially responsible for its revival following Petrosino's murder in 1908, although the squad remained more low-profile than its previous incarnation. It was not officially reinstated for another decade. A year later, he left the NYPD and went into the lumber business in Mexico and the cotton converting business in Boston before returning to the police force five years later.

=== New York City Police Commissioner ===
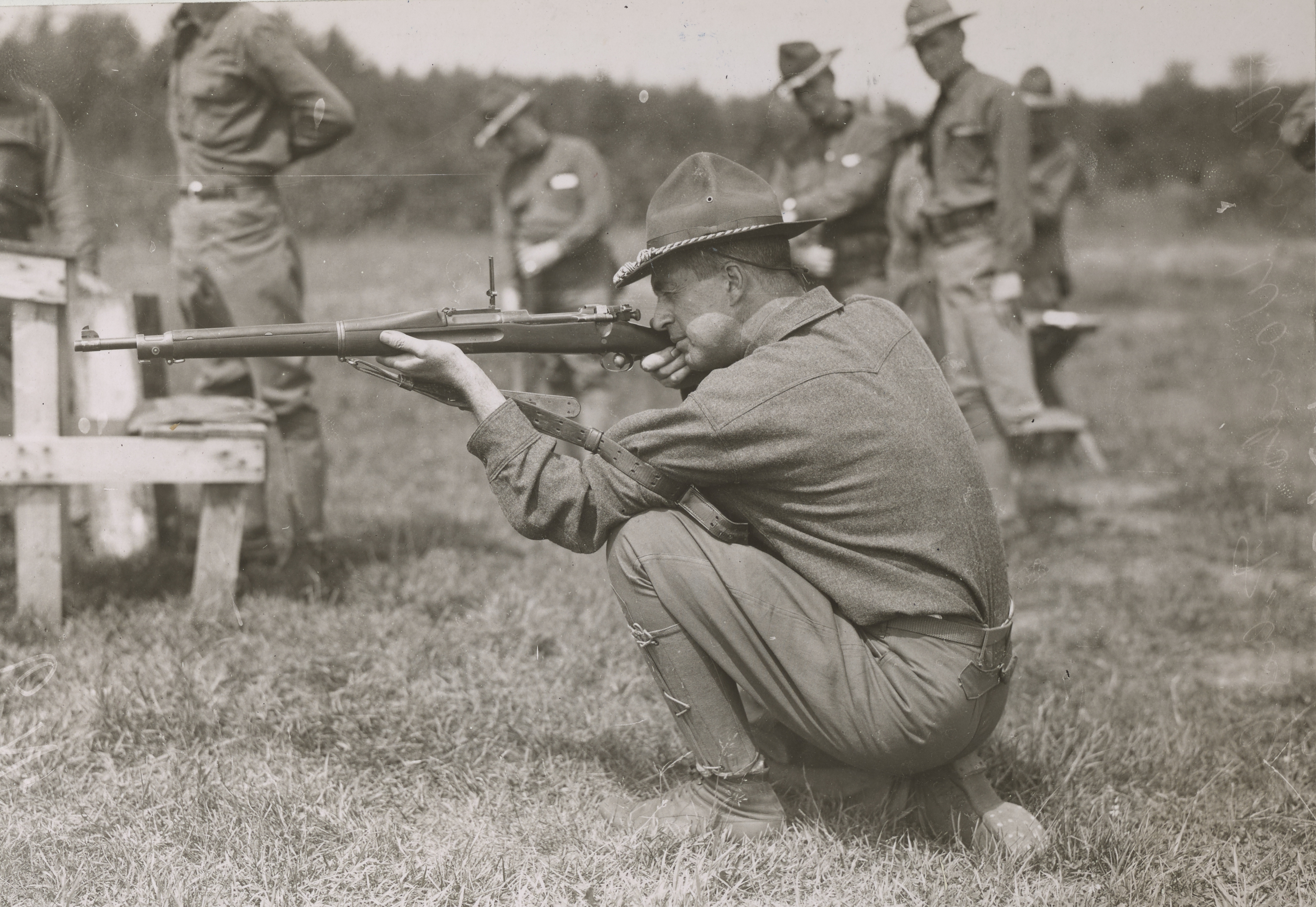
Military training camp for businessmen at Plattsburgh, New York. Arthur Woods, Police Commissioner of New York City, learns to aim.

As part of newly elected Mayor John Purroy Mitchel's reform campaign, Woods succeeded Douglas I. McKay as New York City Police Commissioner in April 1914. Continuing his predecessor's efforts against the many street gangs operating in the city at that time, breaking up gangs in a systematic sweep from the Battery to Spuyten Duyvil which concluded with the Hudson Dusters two years later, he also became involved in labor racketeering during the "Labor Slugger War". Working with District Attorney Charles A. Perkins, he was responsible for the arrests of over 200 known criminals during his first year in office. He retired from policing in 1918. His removal as police commissioner was a direct result of Mitchel's election loss to Tammany Hall-backed John Hylan, a Brooklyn judge, in 1917.

=== Military service ===
That same year, he became an assistant director on the Committee of Public Information on foreign propaganda. In early 1918, he was promoted to lieutenant colonel and assigned to the Division of Military Aeronautics for the United States War Department. He became a full colonel in August and, after a 3-month tour with the American Expeditionary Force overseas, he was appointed assistant director of military aeronautics. In 1920, he was awarded medals from three different countries: the Distinguished Service Medal (U.S.), Order of St. Michael and St. George (U.K.) and the Chevalier of the Legion of Honor (France).

Following the end of World War I, he became an assistant to the United States Secretary of War Newton D. Baker in charge of efforts to reestablish returning American servicemen in civil life. From 1921 to 1922, he presided as chairman on Committee on Civic and Emergency Measures as part of President Warren G. Harding's Conference on Unemployment. In 1925, he was considered to succeed Roy A. Haynes as national prohibition commissioner. Woods also served as trustee for the Board of Education and presided as president and chairman of the board of Rockefeller Center. In addition, he assisted John D. Rockefeller in the restoration of historic Williamsburg, Virginia, a near four-year project lasting from 1927 until 1931. In the early years of the Great Depression, he was the chairman of the President Herbert Hoover's Committee on Employment.

In 1937, he retired from public life due to ill health and settled at 3014 North Street in Washington, D.C. where he lived with his wife for several years.

== Personal life ==
On June 10, 1916, Woods married Helen Morgan Hamilton, granddaughter of industrialist J.P. Morgan and descendant of U.S. Treasury Secretary Alexander Hamilton. Together, they were the parents of four children:

- John Pierpont Woods (1918–2012), who married Claire Warren Streeter (1920–2006), daughter of Edward Streeter, in 1947. They divorced in 1953, and in 1954, he married Joan Holden, daughter of Hale Holden Jr. of Pittsfield, Massachusetts.
- Leonard Hamilton Woods, who married Anina Paepcke, the daughter of Walter Paepcke and Elizabeth Nitze (the sister of Paul Nitze) of Chicago, in 1948. They divorced and in 1963, she married Ian Morgan Hamilton (1923–2010), Leonard's first cousin through his uncle, Pierpont Morgan Hamilton.
- Alexander Hamilton Woods
- Carolie Frances Woods (1927–2008), who married Valentine Hollingsworth Jr., in 1948. She later married Marshall Hays Noble (1923–2002).

Woods died from a cerebral hemorrhage at his North Street home on May 12, 1942. His funeral was held at St. John's Episcopal Church in Georgetown and was later buried in the Woods family cemetery in Ipswich, Massachusetts. Arthur Hale Woods was buried at Arlington National Cemetery.

After his death, his widow remarried to the banker and diplomat Warren Randolph Burgess in 1955, who was serving as the Undersecretary of the Treasury for Monetary Affairs in the Eisenhower administration and later was the Ambassador to the North Atlantic Treaty Organization. Helen died at the age of 88 on January 25, 1985, in Mystic, Connecticut.

== Bibliography ==
- Crime Prevention (1918)
- Policeman and Public (1919)
- Dangerous Drugs (1930)

== See also ==
- Hamilton family

Police appointments
Preceded by Douglas I. McKay	New York City Police Commissioner; 1914–1918	Succeeded by Frederick H. Bugher
