= UGF =

UGF may refer to:

- Ukrainian Ground Forces, the land forces of Ukraine
- Underground facility
- Union of Greens and Farmers, a left of centre environmentalism political alliance in Latvia.
- Unipol Gruppo Finanziario, an Italian financial services company.
- United Givers Fund, a charitable fundraising campaign in the United States
- University of Great Falls, a private Catholic university located in Great Falls, Montana, U.S.A.
- Urogenital fistula, an abnormal tract that exist between the vagina and bladder, ureters, or urethra
