= Sam M. Fleming =

American banker (1908-2000)

- Born: 1908; Franklin, Tennessee, U.S.
- Died: 2000 (aged 91–92); Nashville, Tennessee, U.S.
- Education: Battle Ground Academy; Vanderbilt University
- Occupation: Banker
- Employer: Third National Bank of Nashville
- Spouses: Josephine Cliffe Fleming; Valerie (Ellis) Fleming
- Children: 2
- Relatives: Newton Cannon (great-grandfather); Aaron V. Brown (great-granduncle)

Sam M. Fleming (1908–2000) was an American banker, chief executive and philanthropist. As president and chairman of the Third National Bank of Nashville from 1950 to 1973, he financed many publicly traded corporations as well the country music industry.

== Biography ==
=== Early life ===
Samuel M. Fleming was born in 1908 in Franklin, Tennessee. His great-grandfather, Newton Cannon (1781–1841), served as the Governor of Tennessee from 1835 to 1839, as was his great-granduncle, Aaron V. Brown (1795–1859), from 1845 to 1847. He graduated from Battle Ground Academy in Franklin, Tennessee in 1924 and from Vanderbilt University in Nashville, Tennessee in 1928 where he was a member of the Sigma Alpha Epsilon fraternity.

=== Career ===
Fleming started his career at the New York Trust Company in New York City. However, after the Wall Street crash of 1929, he returned to Tennessee.

In 1931, he started working for the credit department of the Third National Bank of Nashville (now merged with SunTrust Banks). By 1950, he became its president, and later served as its chairman. In this capacity, he played a major role in financing companies like the National Life and Accident Insurance Company, Genesco (NYSE: GCO), the Hospital Corporation of America (NYSE: HCA) and KFC, a subsidiary of YUM! Brands (NYSE: YUM). He also loaned money to Castle Recording, a country music company, and many country music stars were clients of the bank. He sat on the Boards of Directors of the National Life and Accident Insurance Company, Genesco, the Louisville and Nashville Railroad Company, Jack Daniel's, Murray Ohio Manufacturing, the First National Bank of Palm Beach, Florida, and the Nashville Area Chamber of Commerce. He was also a founding director of Hillsboro Enterprises.

He served as the president of the American Bankers Association, a director of the Nashville branch of the Federal Reserve Bank of Atlanta, and a member of the Federal Advisory Council for the Sixth Federal Reserve District.

During the Second World War, he served in the United States Navy Reserve from 1942 to 1945.

=== Philanthropy ===
Fleming served on the board of trust of his alma mater, Vanderbilt University, from 1952 to 2000, and as its chairman from 1975 to 1981. He was named the Trustee of the Year for Private Universities Award from the Association of Governing Boards of Universities and Colleges in 1983. He served on the boards of trustees of Meharry Medical College, Battle Ground Academy, the Harpeth Hall School and The Ensworth School. He also served on the boards of directors of the Nashville Chapter of Junior Achievement, Youth Incorporated, the United Givers Fund and Community Chest as well as on the executive council of the Boy Scouts of America. He served as a deacon and elder of First Presbyterian Church. He was the treasurer of the Tennessee Historical Society and member of the Tennessee Historical Commission and State of Tennessee Civil War Centennial Commission.

He played golf with President Dwight Eisenhower (1890–1969) and later supported President Lyndon Johnson (1908–1973).

=== Personal life and death ===
Fleming was first married to Josephine Cliffe Fleming. They had a son, Daniel Milton Fleming, and a daughter, Joanne Cliffe Fleming Hayes, who serves on the Board of Trust of Vanderbilt University. He remarried to Valerie (Ellis) Fleming in 1983.

Fleming died of pneumonia in 2000 at the Vanderbilt University Hospital in Nashville. His funeral took place at the First Presbyterian Church in Nashville.

=== Legacy ===
- His portrait, painted by Ann Street, is displayed in Kirkland Hall, the administration building on the campus of Vanderbilt University.
- Fleming Yard on the campus of Vanderbilt University is named in his honor.

== Secondary source ==
- Ridley Wills, II, Yours to Count On (A Biography of Nashville Banker Extraordinaire Sam M. Fleming) (Nashville, Tennessee: Vanderbilt University Press, 2007).
