= St. Elizabeth's Memorial Chapel, Tuxedo =

Chapel in Tuxedo Park, New York

St. Elizabeth's Memorial Chapel
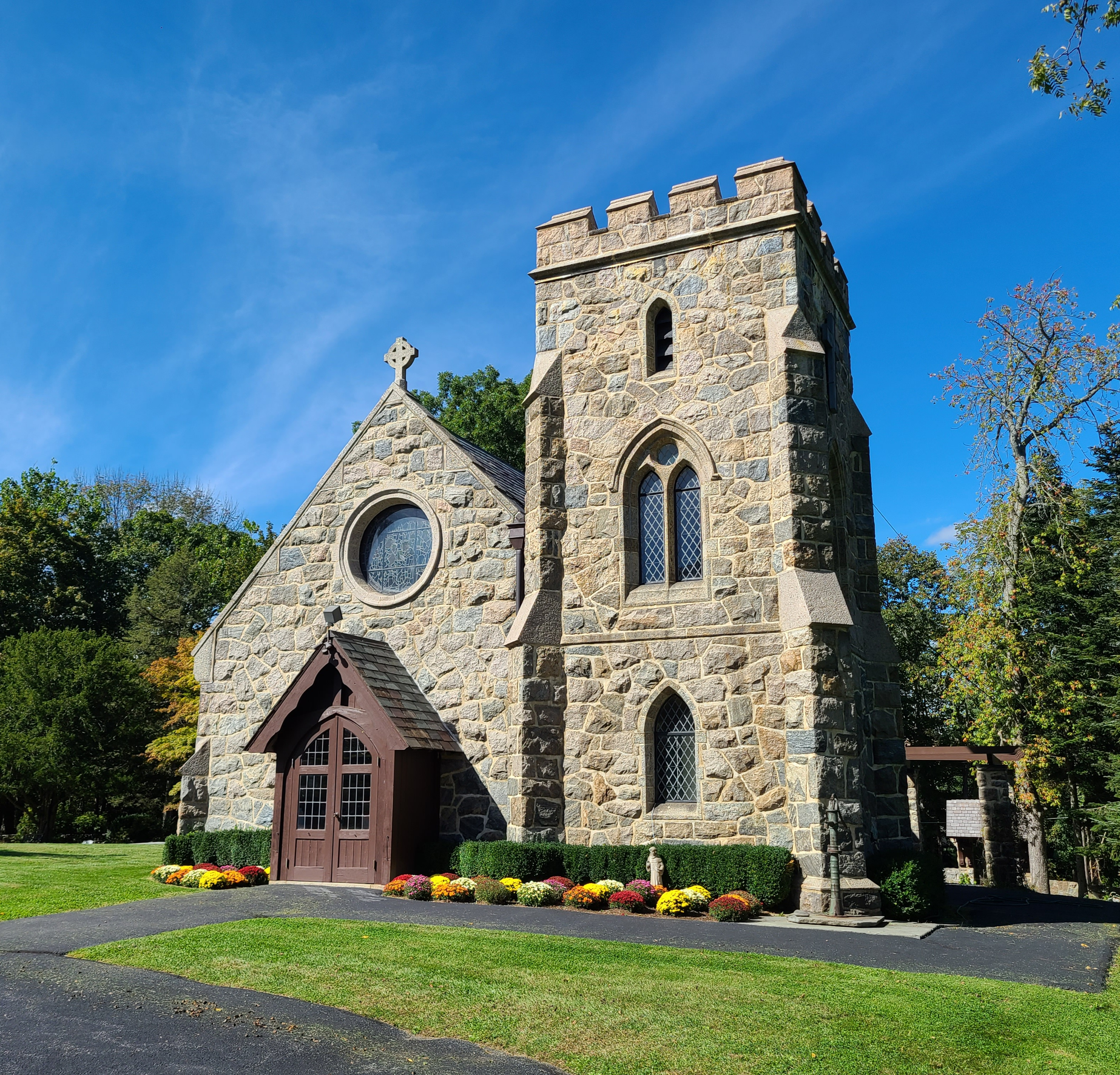
- St. Elizabeth's Memorial Chapel
- 41°9′18″N 74°13′39″W
- Location: 38 Chapel Turn Rd, Tuxedo Park, New York
- Country: United States
- Denomination: Anglican Catholic Church
- Tradition: Continuing Anglican
- Website: http://www.stelizabethstuxedo.org/

History
- Dedication: Elizabeth Schuyler Hamilton

Architecture
- Architect: Trowbridge & Livingston
- Years built: 1921

Specifications
- Materials: Granite, slate

Administration
- Diocese: Northeast

Clergy
- Pastor: The Ven. Canon Merrill Perkins

St. Elizabeth's Memorial Chapel is an Anglican chapel located in the hamlet of Eagle Valley in Tuxedo, New York. Originally built as a chapel and final resting place for members of the Hamilton family, the chapel and the associated parish is notable for being at one time the only privately owned and administered Episcopal church in the New York Diocese.

The parish is currently affiliated with the Diocese of the Northeast of the Anglican Catholic Church (ACA), itself a member of the Traditional Anglican Communion. St. Elizabeth's was the home parish of the Right Reverend George D. Langberg; Langberg is also a retired Bishop Ordinary for the Diocese of the Northeast and the Tuxedo town historian. Reverend Langberg's consecration as suffragan bishop took place at St. Elizabeth's in 1998.

== History ==
The chapel was constructed in 1921 in Eagle Valley, a hamlet in the Town of Tuxedo once owned almost in its entirety by the Hamilton family. The Hamilton's 2,000 acre estate included the main house "Table Rock" and the smaller "Cotswold"; the former is presently owned by the Sisters Servants of Mary Immaculate in the Immaculate Conception Province in the U.S.

St. Elizabeth's was dedicated to the memory of Elizabeth Schuyler Hamilton, who died during the Spanish influenza pandemic. Elizabeth was the daughter of William Pierson Hamilton—great-grandson of founding father Alexander Hamilton—and Juliet Pierpont Morgan Hamilton—daughter of financier J.P. Morgan. The chapel was consecrated by Bishop Philip Rhinelander sometime before 1923. The architects Trowbridge & Livingston designed St. Elizabeth's to evoke an English country chapel, combining elements of 16th and 17th century church design in their granite and slate edifice. Scottish artist Henry Wynd Young providing the chapel's stained glass.

St. Elizabeth's was initially an autonomous church employing the Episcopal liturgy prior to joining the ACA. A regional diocesan officer for the Episcopal Diocese stated that the diocese had "no official position on the chapel," and that St. Elizabeth's was "simply considered a 'preaching station'" as opposed to an official congregation. During the tenure of nearby St. Mary's-in-Tuxedo Episcopal Church rector Leon Cartmell, a group of St. Mary's parishioners began attending St. Elizabeth's after growing dissatisfied with Father Cartmell's high church services.

A service in commemoration of Alexander Hamilton and in observance of the Bicentennial was held at St. Elizabeth's in January 1975. Hamilton and Morgan family weddings are known to have taken place at St. Elizabeth's.

== Burials ==
Notable burials at St. Elizabeth's Memorial Chapel Cemetery include:

- Elizabeth Schuyler Hamilton, in whose name the chapel was given and sister of Pierpont Morgan Hamilton
- Juliet Pierpont Morgan, daughter of J.P. Morgan
- Alexander Morgan Hamilton, philanthropist, civil servant and brother of Elizabeth
- Ernest Henry Schelling, pianist, assistant conductor of the New York Philharmonic and conductor of the Baltimore Symphony Orchestra
- Helen Naomi Forbes Salomon, mother of Clarence MacKenzie Lewis; provided decor for Lewis's Skylands estate
