= Andrew McNally (disambiguation) =

Andrew McNally (1838–1904) was an American publisher, co-founder of Rand McNally & Company.

Andrew McNally may also refer to:

- Andrew McNally III (1909–2001), American printer and publisher
- Andrew McNally (baseball) (born 1973), Australian baseball player

== See also ==
- Andy McNally (born 1982), British rugby player
