= Sterlington =

Sterlington may refer to the following places in the United States:

- Sterlington, Louisiana
- Sterlington, New York
