= Banker Farmer =

Newspaper in Champaign, Illinois

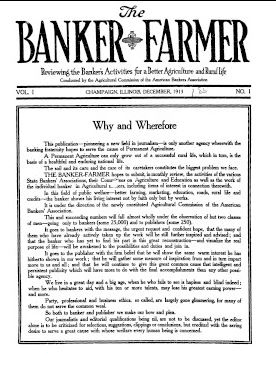
- Banker Farmer (December 1, 1913)
- Type: Monthly newspaper
- Publisher: Agricultural Commission of the American Bankers Association
- Founded: 1910
- Headquarters: Champaign, Illinois
- City: Champaign
- Country: United States
- OCLC number: 663831907

Banker Farmer is a newsletter founded in Champaign, Illinois in the early 20th century. Its slogan is "Reviewing Bankers' Activities for a Better Agriculture and Rural Life." It is conducted by the Agriculture Commission of the American Bankers Association. The first issue was published on December 1, 1913, and highlighted the reasons for its publication:

"This publication--pioneering a new field in journalism-- is only another agency wherewith the banking fraternity hopes to serve the cause of Permanent Agriculture. A Permanent Agriculture can only grow out of a successful rural life, which in turn, is the basis of a healthful and enduring national life."
