= 1958 Sterlington railroad collision =

Train collision in New York state

Coordinates: 41.1462°N 74.1880°W

Details
- Date: 11 August 1958; 6:47 AM EST
- Location: Ramapo, New York
- Cause: Signalman failed to hold train, then a radio dead spot prevented him from informing the train of his mistake

Statistics
- Trains: 2
- Deaths: 5
- Injured: 22 to 36 (conflicting sources)

The 1958 Sterlington railroad disaster was a head-on collision by two Erie Railroad trains on August 11, 1958 at 6:47 AM killing 5 people and injuring 22 to 36 (sources are conflicting). The collision occurred when the operator in the signal tower at Suffern failed to hold the westbound train No. 53 at Suffern for the eastbound No. 50 commuter train from Monroe, New York, to Hoboken, New Jersey. When he realized his error, he attempted to contact the crews via radio but was unsuccessful due to a radio dead spot. The trains impacted head-on right in front of the now abandoned Erie Railroad depot in Sterlington, New York near Sloatsburg, killing the crew of the locomotive No. 859 from train No.50 as well as two passengers and injuring the crew of the locomotive No. 1402 from the westbound train.

== Accident ==
Train #50, an eastbound passenger train was led by an American Locomotive Company PA-1 diesel-electric locomotive #859, with four passenger coaches. Beginning its day at 5:25 a.m. at Monroe, New York. Meanwhile, train #53, a westbound train headed for Port Jervis, New York with an EMD GP7 locomotive #1402, a road-switcher, an express car, mail car, mail-baggage car and two passenger coaches departed Hoboken Terminal in Hoboken, New Jersey at 4:00 am.

At 5:15 am, the train dispatcher at Hoboken was notified by the NJ (Newburgh Junction) interlocking tower operator that an eastbound freight train, Extra #703 East, would be coming off the Graham Line with three diesel-electric locomotives, 115 freight cars and a caboose. In order to keep the freight train moving and not delay train #50, they moved the freight train onto the eastbound track, switching to westbound track at Hillburn. The dispatcher informed the NJ tower operator at 5:16 by telephone to hold westbound trains and put a stop signal up. The freight was placed on the eastbound main track when it passed NJ interlocking at 5:28 am, going about 25 miles per hour.

Train #50 saw the stop signal at NJ tower, and a yellow flag, which noted that the operator had a Form 19 train order to let the freight through; the engineer of train #50 sounded the horn and a train order No. 103 was given by the New Jersey operator. Order No. 103 meant that train #50 could use the westbound main track between NJ interlocking, and the first crossover track west of Hillburn, and had priority over other trains. Train #50 crossed the NJ interlocking station at 5:32 am, making stops at Southfields, Tuxedo and Sloatsburg.

As train #50 approached what was to become the scene of the accident, the engineer and a fireman and a road foreman were sitting the cab of locomotive #859 while the conductor, front brakeman and a flagman were located in the first coach of the train; the road foreman noted that after they departed Sloatsburg, they had seen train #53 coming up the line, but could not distinguish which track it was on because of the curve and vegetation alongside the tracks. When the road foreman and fireman saw train #53 on the westbound track, they notified the brakeman, who reduced the speed from 50 miles per hour to 20 miles per hour. Meanwhile, the engineer and the fireman entered the engine compartment of locomotive #859.

On train #53, the crew was divided between cars; the engineer and his colleagues were in control of locomotive #1402, which was now running on the westbound mainline track north of Hillburn. The headlights were also dimmed on locomotive #1402. With no hold order for them, they continued on the westbound track. When the engineer of #1402 saw the oncoming train, the emergency brakes were activated.

The two trains collided in front of the freight depot of the Erie Railroad in the hamlet of Sterlington. The two engines were described as being welded together from the force of the impact by officials responding to the scene, while several of the coaches on train #50 crashed into each other, pulling their wheels off the track. However, neither the locomotives or the cars behind them derailed.

Number 53 was to be given a "31" order at Suffern interlocking tower ("SF"). A "31" order requires the train to stop and the crew to physically sign for the order. A "19" order (which was issued at NJ to Train 50) can be handed up to the crew of a moving train. The tower operator at SF failed to use his signal to hold Number 53 as the rules required, and only after the train passed SF did he realize his fatal mistake.

== Aftermath ==
The case was ruled to be caused by human error and the signalman Frederick Roth was cleared of culpable negligence charges and was laid off in September
