= American Scenic and Historic Preservation Society =

Organization (1895–1979)

- Formation: 1895; 131 years ago
- Dissolved: 1979; 47 years ago
- Type: Nonprofit, member-supported
- Legal status: Dissolved
- Headquarters: New York City, US
- Website: www.nypap.org/content/american-scenic-and-historic-preservation-society

The American Scenic and Historic Preservation Society was created in 1895 as New York's first organized preservation lobby. The Society operated as a national organization to protect the natural scenery and the preservation of historic landmarks; to preserve landmarks and records of the past or present; to erect memorials and promote appreciation of the scenic beauty of America.

There is no information about when the Society dissolved but there are no records of their activities after 1979.

== Projects ==
The Society's primary purpose was to protect historic and/or scenic sites. In many cases, it acted as custodian for these properties, purchasing them, providing maintenance, and keeping them open to the public. Examples include:

- Battle Island Park
- Fort Brewerton
- Hamilton Grange
- John Boyd Thacher Park
- John William Draper Memorial Park, Hastings-on-Hudson
- Letchworth Park
- Philipse Manor Hall
- Stony Point Battlefield Reservation
- Watkins Glen

== Awards ==
The Society had responsibility for selecting the recipients of a number of Awards, the most prestigious being the Pugsley Medal, created by Cornelius Amory Pugsley in 1928. The award honors champions of parks and conservation. After the dissolution of the Society, the Pugsley Medal was awarded by the National Park Foundation. In recent years, the Award has been presented by the American Academy for Park and Recreation Administration.

== Officers ==
- 1895–1904 Andrew Haswell Green
- 1905–1906 Walter Seth Logan
- 1907–1926 George Frederick Kunz
- 1934–1940 LeRoy Elwood Kimball
- 1941 Alexander Hamilton
- 1942–1950 George McAneny
- 1951–1965 Alexander Hamilton
