= Douglas Imrie McKay =

Douglas I. McKay
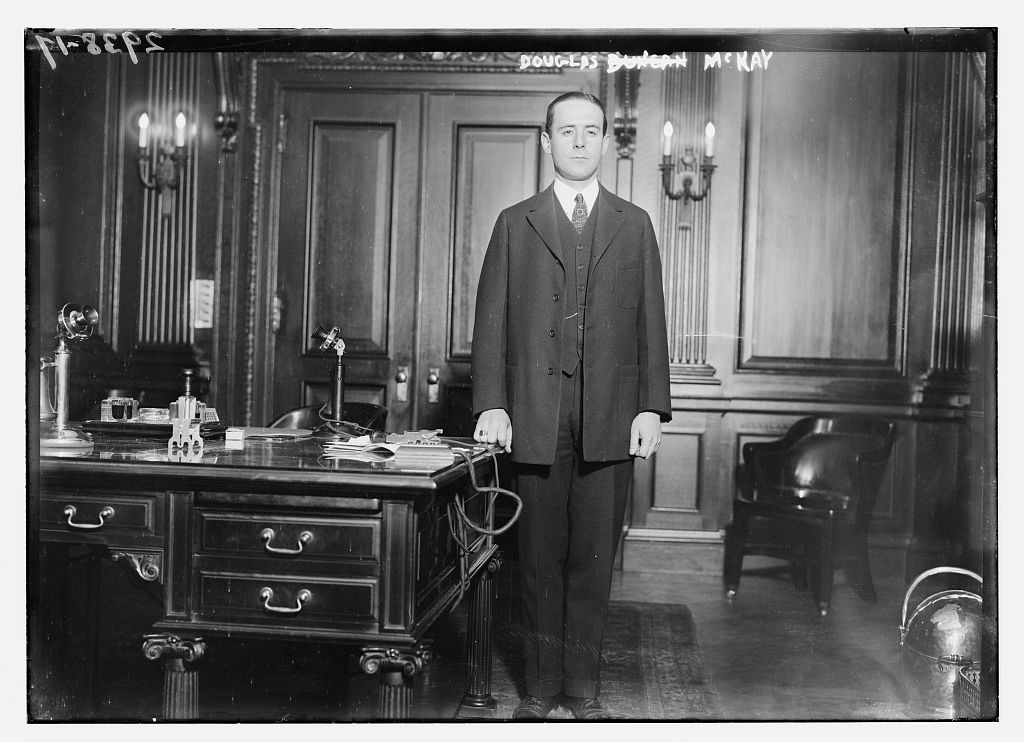
- McKay in 1913

New York City Police Commissioner
- In office 1914–1914
- Appointed by: John Purroy Mitchel
- Preceded by: Rhinelander Waldo
- Succeeded by: Arthur Woods

Personal details
- Born: Douglas Imrie McKay; May 25, 1883 New York City, U.S.
- Died: September 24, 1962 (aged 83) San Jose, California, U.S.
- Spouse: Pauline McKay
- Children: 2
- Education: New York City College; United States Military Academy
- Occupation: NYPD police official, artillery officer and businessman
- Known for: U.S. Army officer who served as NYPD Police Commissioner during 1914; began two-year campaign to wipe out the many street gangs active in New York City.

Douglas Imrie McKay (May 25, 1883 – September 24, 1962) was an American artillery and law enforcement officer and New York City Police Department police official who served as New York City Police Commissioner in 1914. His five months in office and eventual departure from the police force were fraught with controversy, however, his two-year campaign against the New York underworld eventually rid the city of the many street gangs active since the early-to mid 19th century. In the years following his retirement, McKay also had a successful career in business, holding high-level positions in a number of corporations. In 1926, McKay was charged with reckless driving which resulted in the death of Mary Stockstrom, mother of 4.

== Biography ==
Douglas Imrie McKay was born on May 25, 1883, in New York City. He attended New York City College and graduated from the United States Military Academy in 1905 as a second lieutenant. McKay was of Scottish heritage. He became a coast artillery officer in the U.S. Army and was stationed at Fort Adams, Rhode Island from September 1905 to March 1907 and then a month at Fort Caswell, North Carolina. McKay was promoted to the rank of first lieutenant and remained at Fort Monroe, Virginia until his resignation on May 23, 1907.

=== Police Commissioner ===
When McKay was appointed New York City Police Commissioner by reform mayor John Purroy Mitchel on December 31, 1913, who chose McKay the basis of his reputation, he was the youngest man ever to have held the position. He immediately went into action by initiating a sweep of Manhattan to clear out the countless street gangs, many of whose origins could be traced to the 1860s and earlier, then active in the city. He also made reforms within the NYPD, particularly concerning police corruption, which included "breaking" or demoting several high-ranking police officers. On one occasion, he demoted a police inspector to captain and then suspended him for allowing honky-tonks to operate in the Tenderloin district. He also revived the police lineup and used it with such success that it was kept by the police force on a permanent basis.

In the aftermath of a gun battle that lasted nearly a half an hour in front of Arlington Hall, during which court clerk Frederick Strauss was shot and killed, Mayor Mitchell personally ordered McKay to "suppress the gangs at all costs". The previous order prohibiting use of clubs by Mayor Gaynor was rescinded. McKay immediately suspended the local precinct captain in which the battle occurred and sent in Deputy Commissioner George Samuel Dougherty with a squad of detectives who arrested over 100 gang members within twenty-four hours.

McKay's tactics, although successful, were the source of frequent arguing and criticism between himself and the mayor's office. His militant attitude against the New York underworld concerned local politicians, particularly in Tammany Hall, who felt he was a political liability. A number of magistrates also expressed concern over the commissioner's hasty actions. They also complained that his "sight arrest" orders, in which loiterers were subject to immediate arrest, filled up city's jails overnight. The situation created a serious problem by delaying the city legal system when many of these cases the charges would be dropped for lack of evidence. McKay responded by expressing a lack of backing from the city and that, in his opinion, his position was regarded by city officials as "the Mayor's secretary for police affairs".

=== Later career ===
McKay eventually left the police force after five months, his successor Arthur Woods carrying on his campaign against the underworld which ended in 1916, taking a position as vice president of J.G. White & Co. and become president of the International Pulverized Fuel Equipment Corporation in 1918. Upon the United States' entry into World War I, McKay returned to military service as a colonel and was assigned as director of artillery ammunition production in March 1918. In August 1922, he was elected president of the Standard Coupler Company. McKay later returned to the police force for a brief time during Prohibition, serving as special deputy police commissioner and became the state commander of the American Legion in 1928. McKay eventually entered the insurance business and, in 1935, he became president of the New York Title Insurance Company.

McKay later retired to San Jose, California, where he died on September 24, 1962. He was survived by his wife Pauline and two daughters, Mary and Patricia McKay.

Preceded by Rhinelander Waldo	New York City Police Commissioner; 1913-1914	Succeeded by Arthur Woods
