= Demas T. Craw =

United States Army Air Forces officer

Demas Thurlow Craw
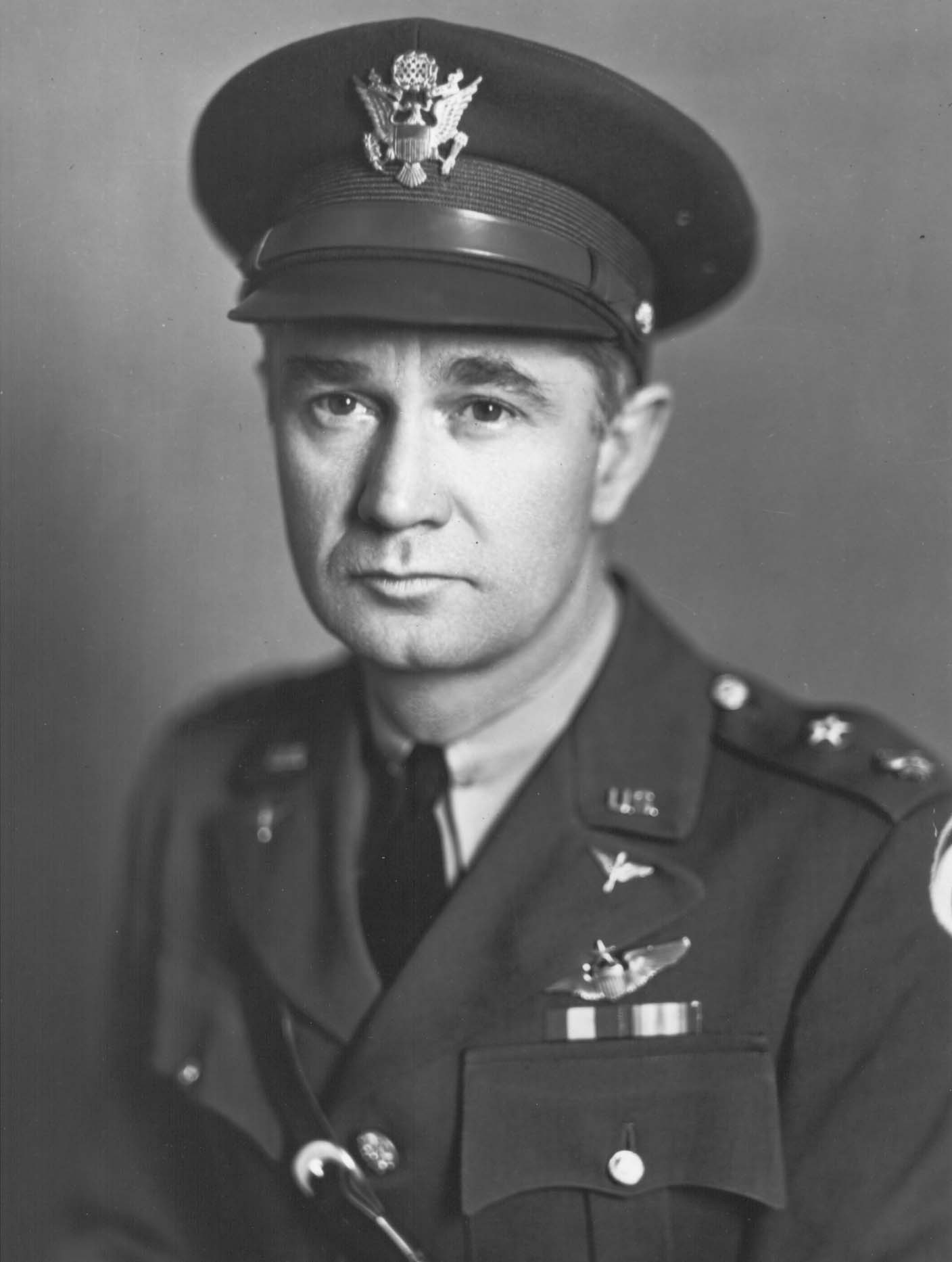
- Demas T. Craw circa 1940
- Born: April 9, 1900; Long Lake Township, Michigan, U.S.
- Died: November 8, 1942 (aged 42) near Port Lyautey, French Morocco
- Burial place: Oakwood Cemetery, Traverse City, Michigan
- Military career
- Allegiance: United States of America
- Branch: United States Army; United States Army Air Forces
- Service years: 1918–1942
- Rank: Colonel
- Nicknames: Nick, "Nicodemus"
- Commands: 19th Pursuit Squadron
- Conflicts: World War I; World War II; Operation Torch †
- Awards: Medal of Honor; Purple Heart

Demas Thurlow "Nick" Craw (April 9, 1900 – November 8, 1942) was a United States Army Air Forces officer and a recipient of the United States military's highest decoration—the Medal of Honor—for his actions in World War II. Craw and Maj. Pierpont M. Hamilton were the first Army Air Forces recipients of the Medal in the European-Mediterranean theater of World War II and the only AAF members to be awarded that decoration for valor not involving air combat.

== Biography ==
Craw was born in Long Lake Township, Michigan (near Traverse City), to Mark Craw, a game warden, and his wife Clara. He was twin brother to Theron Craw, who died in a hunting accident in 1927. A younger sister, Jane, became a registered nurse and served in the Army Nurse Corps during World War II. The twins attended Traverse City public schools, but dropped out of Traverse City High School during World War I to enlist in the United States Army on April 18, 1918, at Columbus Barracks, Ohio. Craw was sent to Camp Stanley, Texas, for training with the 12th Cavalry, then transferred to Columbus, New Mexico, on the border with Mexico. He was promoted to private first class in November 1918 and sent to Machine Gun School at Camp Hancock, Georgia. There he applied for and was selected to attend the Central Officer's Training School at Camp Gordon, Georgia.

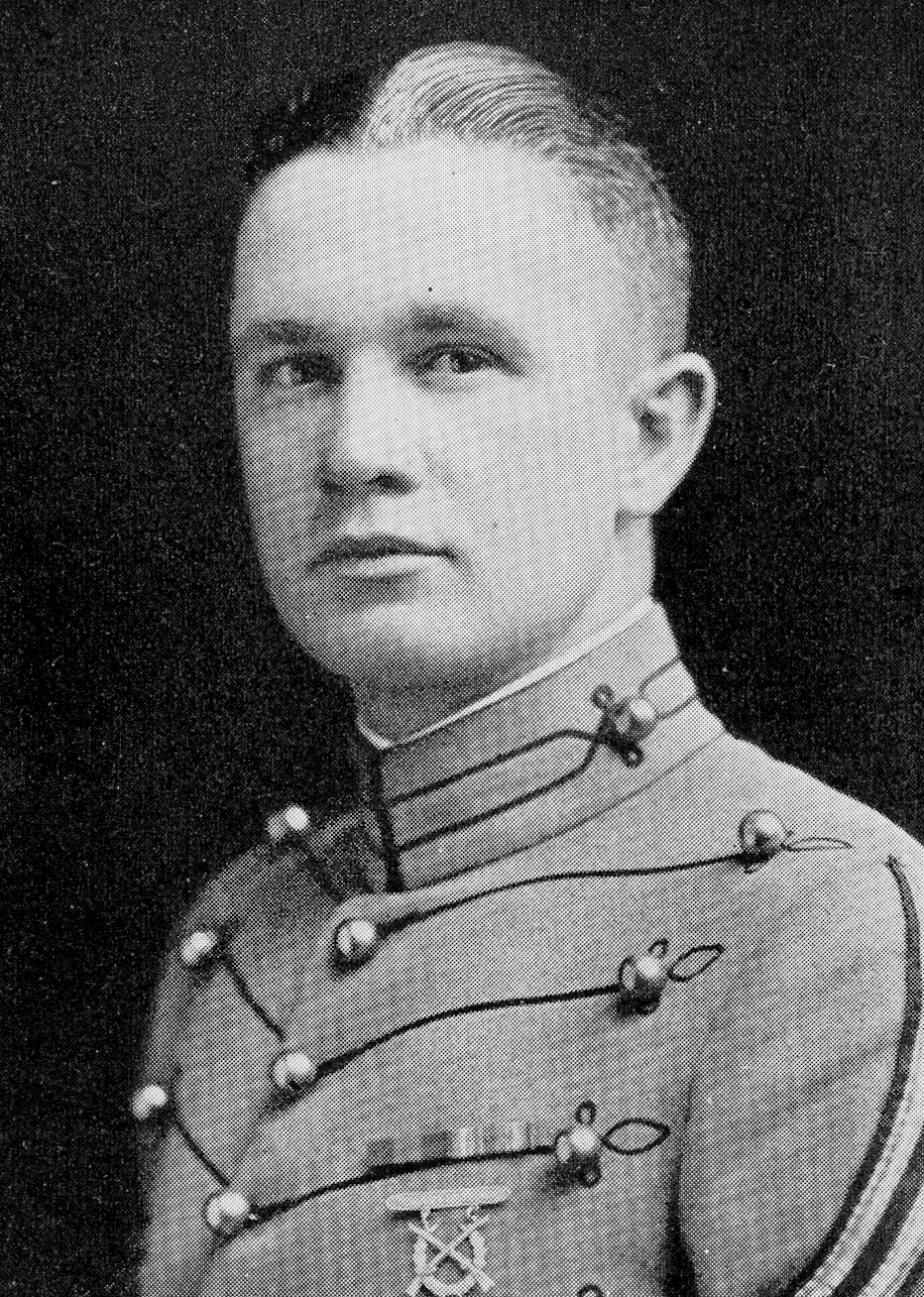
At West Point in 1924

In the demobilization of the Army following the Armistice, Craw was discharged on February 15, 1919, but re-enlisted three months later in the infantry at Grand Rapids, Michigan. Assigned as a recruiter, he was promoted to corporal, but continued to pursue a commission. At Camp Zachary Taylor, Kentucky, where he was attached to the 2nd Field Artillery Regiment, Craw undertook a two-month preparatory course in February 1920 for entry into the United States Military Academy. Returning to Grand Rapids afterward, Craw was discharged on May 14 and entered West Point on July 1, 1920.

While attending the Military Academy he received his lifelong nickname of "Nick", shortened from "Nicodemus" (a word play on his given name), and developed an ambition to fly. However an eye injury incurred while playing polo nearly ended his aviation career. Craw graduated on June 12, 1924, ranked 371 in general order of merit in his class of 405 members, and was commissioned as a second lieutenant, Coast Artillery Corps.

=== Air Corps service ===
After his eye injury healed, he applied for pilot training with the Air Service on March 13, 1926. In August, he began Primary and Basic flight training at Brooks Field, Texas, went on to Advanced at Kelly Field on February 28, 1927, where he received a rating of Airplane Pilot on August 12, 1927. Craw joined the 1st Pursuit Group at Selfridge Field, Michigan, transferred his commission to the Air Corps on March 21, 1928, and was promoted to first lieutenant on January 3, 1930. Craw returned to the Air Corps Training Center at San Antonio, Texas, as an instructor of Basic Flight training at Duncan Field, and was reassigned in January 1929, to instruct Advanced Flight Training.

In June 1930, Craw was briefly assigned to Mitchel Field, New York, to await a four-year tour with the 19th Pursuit Squadron at Wheeler Field, Territory of Hawaii. There he met Mary Victoria ("Vicki") Wesson, daughter of the president of the Smith & Wesson Firearms Company. They married in 1931, and had one son, Nicholas. Craw commanded the 19th PS from August 4, 1932, to the end of his tour and returned to Mitchel Field on September 15, 1934. He was promoted to captain on April 20, 1935.

In September 1937, Craw was assigned as a student to the Air Corps Tactical School at Maxwell Field, Alabama, graduating June 20, 1938. His next billet was as Inspector General and Assistant Intelligence Officer, General Headquarters Air Force, at Langley Field, Virginia. On March 11, 1940, Craw was promoted to major. His tour at Langley included temporary duty as an air observer for the War Department in the Netherlands East Indies, China, Romania, and India.

In October 1940, Craw traveled to Cairo, Egypt, as an observer to the Royal Air Force. During combat against Italy in Libya, he was slightly wounded, and with the onset of the Greco-Italian War, went to Athens as assistant military attaché. He reportedly came under fire 136 times and participated in twenty-one RAF bombing sorties during the assignments. When the German army invaded Greece in April 1941, Craw was captured and interned for six weeks, until exchanged at Sofia, Bulgaria, and was awarded the Order of George I (Officer class) by the King of Greece. He returned to Egypt and observed the campaign against the Afrika Korps in June 1941, then was assigned as deputy executive officer of the II Bomber Command at Fort George Wright, Washington. On November 15, 1941, he was promoted to lieutenant colonel, and on March 1, 1942, after the United States entered the war, to colonel.

In October, Craw was named air officer for Maj. General Lucian K. Truscott, commanding one of the sub-task forces, Force Goalpost, of Operation Torch, an amphibious invasion of North Africa. He sailed with the invasion force from Virginia and while en route, volunteered to assist another Army Air Forces officer, Maj. Pierpont M. Hamilton, Truscott's intelligence officer, in delivering a message to the local French commander near Port Lyautey, French Morocco, to broker a cease fire, should French forces resist.

== Medal of Honor action ==
On November 8, 1942, French forces resisted Allied landing operations and Craw undertook the mission with Hamilton. The officers intended to land at a jetty on the Sebou River near French headquarters, but the alerted French defenders began shelling the landing force, and they instead came ashore with the first wave of Goalpost landing craft carrying troops of the 2nd Battalion, 60th Regimental Combat Team.

After disembarking on Green Beach before dawn, and still under hostile fire from shore batteries, the officers commandeered a small truck. They were strafed by French aircraft when it became stuck in a muddy marsh. After the truck was extricated by a detachment of combat engineers, they attempted to continue their mission but were forced to return to the beach when caught in the exchanges of French artillery and naval gunfire from Task Group 34.8 of the United States Navy. When Truscott expressed misgivings about the mission, Craw convinced him to allow them to continue. They located a jeep and enlisted its driver, Pfc. Orris V. Correy, to cross through the French lines. Craw carried unfurled American and French flags, and Hamilton a white flag, in an attempt to safeguard their passage.

At dawn the officers reached the jetty that was to have been their original starting point. After several contacts with French troops to obtain directions, and requesting a guide (which was refused), the jeep proceeded cautiously approximately six miles into Port Lyautey. As they came over a rise on the outskirts near the French headquarters, a hidden machine gun position took them under sustained fire and killed Craw instantly with a burst to the chest. Hamilton and Correy were both captured, but Hamilton eventually completed the mission and arranged the surrender of French forces.

Craw was awarded the Medal of Honor four months later, on March 4, 1943, for his part in the mission. Hamilton was also awarded the Medal of Honor in January, 1943.

== Awards and honors ==

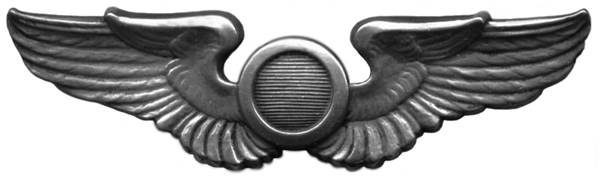

Army Air Forces Senior Pilot Badge
Observer Badge
Medal of Honor	Purple Heart	Mexican Service Medal
World War I Victory Medal	American Defense Service Medal	American Campaign Medal
European–African–Middle Eastern Campaign Medal with bronze campaign star	World War II Victory Medal	Gold Cross of the Royal Order of George I (Greece)

=== Medal of Honor citation ===
Colonel Craw's official Medal of Honor citation reads:

For conspicuous gallantry and intrepidity in action above and beyond the call of duty. On November 8, 1942, near Port Lyautey, French Morocco, Col. Craw volunteered to accompany the leading wave of assault boats to the shore and pass through the enemy lines to locate the French commander with a view to suspending hostilities. This request was first refused as being too dangerous but upon the officer's insistence that he was qualified to undertake and accomplish the mission he was allowed to go. Encountering heavy fire while in the landing boat and unable to dock in the river because of shell fire from shore batteries, Col. Craw, accompanied by 1 officer and 1 soldier, succeeded in landing on the beach at Mehdia Plage under constant low-level strafing from 3 enemy planes. Riding in a bantam truck toward French headquarters, progress of the party was hindered by fire from our own naval guns. Nearing Port Lyautey, Col. Craw was instantly killed by a sustained burst of machinegun fire at pointblank range from a concealed position near the road.

=== Legacy ===
The military airfield at Port Lyautey was named Craw Field in 1943. Other entities named in commemoration were:

- Col. Demas T. Craw, U.S. Army Auxiliary Aircraft Repair Ship FS-207 (January 1945);
- Demas T. Craw Army Reserve Center, Traverse City, Michigan;
- Demas T. Craw Army VA Clinic, Traverse City, Michigan;
- Demas T. Craw Squadron, Arnold Air Society, University of Virginia.

Demas T Craw Marker Mehdia Beach Morocco 1952 / Current location or existence unknown. This is the only photo believed to exist of the marker.

== See also ==
- List of Medal of Honor recipients
- List of Medal of Honor recipients for World War II
