= 1st New York Infantry Regiment =

- Active: April 22, 1861, to May 25, 1863
- Country: United States
- Allegiance: Union
- Branch: Infantry
- Size: 846, (Note: As reported back to Adjutant General Hillhouse upon departure from New York on May 26, 1861) 749 (Note: As reported back to Adjutant General Hillhouse, on December 31, 1862), 439 (Note: As reported back to Adjutant General Sprague, on December 31, 1863)
- Equipment: Model 1842 Springfield Muskets (.69 caliber, smooth) (Note: On 18 Sep 1861, 846 Harper's Ferry smooth bore Model 1842s, altered from flint to percussion locks. As reported back to Adjutant General on December 31, 1863. This was the number turned in when issued Enfields and Springfields.), Enfield Rifled Muskets, 1861
- Engagements: Battle of Big Bethel; Battle of Fair Oaks; Seven Days Battles; Battle of Oak Grove; Battle of Glendale; Battle of Malvern Hill; Battle of Groveton; Second Battle of Bull Run; Battle of Chantilly; Battle of Fredericksburg; Battle of Chancellorsville

Commanders
- Colonel: William H. Allen
- Colonel: Garret Dyckman,
- Colonel: John Frederick Pierson

Insignia
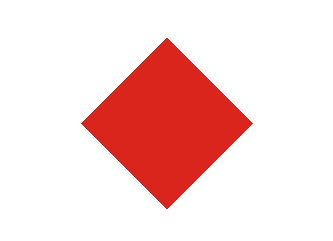
- III Corps (1st Division) badge

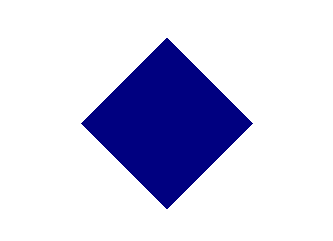
- III Corps (3rd Division) badge

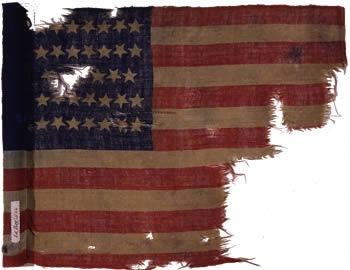
Regimental Flag of 1st NY

The 1st New York Infantry Regiment was an infantry regiment that served in the Union Army during the American Civil War.

== Organization ==
The 1st New York Volunteer Infantry Regiment was recruited and organized in New York city to serve two years. It was accepted by the State and mustered in the service of the United States at Staten Island, Companies A and F April 22; B, C, D and E April 23; I — Scandinavian Volunteers— and K April 24 and May 3, respectively; and G and H May 7, 1861. It was the first regiment to be accepted for that length of time.

== Service ==
On May 26, 1861, the regiment, under Col. William H. Allen, embarked for Fortress Monroe and left the state. It served there until June 10, when it received orders to move to the support of the force at Big Bethel and was active at the battle of that name. Returning to camp until July 3, the regiment was then ordered to Newport News and remained there until June 3, 1862, receiving over 370 recruits during the winter. The most noteworthy incident of this period was the attack on the fortifications by the CSS Virginia on March 8, 1862.

In March 1862, it was assigned to the 1st Brigade, 1st Division, Department of Virginia. From March, 1862; in the 3rd Brigade, 3rd Division, III Corps, Army of the Potomac. On June 6, 1862, the 1st was assigned to the 3rd Brigade, 3rd Division, III Corps, Army of the Potomac. With this brigade it was in the Peninsula Campaign. It was engaged at Peach Orchard and Glendale during the Seven Days battles, losing in the latter battle 230 members killed, wounded, and missing.

It then fought in the Battle of Malvern Hill, where it was transferred to the 2nd Brigade, 1st Division, III Corps. After the battle, it was sent to Yorktown until the evacuation from the Peninsula. It returned to Alexandria and was ordered to Manassas, where it participated in the Second Battle of Bull Run on August 30. It fought at Chantilly and then remained in the defenses of Washington until October 11, 1862. At that time, it was attached to the 3rd Brigade, moved to Edwards' ferry, Middleburg and finally Falmouth, where it was stationed until the Battle of Fredericksburg, in which it took part. Winter quarters were established at Falmouth. It took part in the Mud March in January 1863. On May 2 and 3, 1863, the 1st was engaged at Chancellorsville.

It soon left the Army of the Potomac and headed home. On May 25, 1863, commanded by Col. J. Fred. Pierson, the men of the regiment were honorably discharged and mustered out in New York City.

== Affiliations, battle honors, detailed service, and casualties ==
=== Organizational affiliation ===
Attached to:

- Attached to Fort Monroe, Camp Hamilton and Newport News, Va., Dept. of Virginia, May 1861, to May, 1862.
- 1st Brigade, 1st Division, Dept. of Virginia, to June 1862.
- 3rd Brigade, 3rd Division, III Corps, Army of the Potomac, to August 1862.
- 2nd Brigade, 1st Division, III Corps, to September 1862.
- 3rd Brigade, 1st Division, III Corps, to May 1863.

=== List of battles ===
The official list of battles in which the regiment bore a part:

- Battle of Big Bethel
- Seven Days Battles
- Battle of Oak Grove
- Battle of Glendale
- Battle of Malvern Hill
- Battle of Groveton (Note: The NPS has established these dates for the battle. The references by Greene, Hennessy, Salmon, and Kennedy, whose works are closely aligned with the NPS, adopt these dates as well. However, all of the other references to this article specify that the action on August 28 was a prelude to, but separate from, the Second Battle of Bull Run. Some of these authors name the action on August 28 the Battle of Groveton or Brawner's Farm.)
- Second Battle of Bull Run
- Battle of Chantilly
- Battle of Fredericksburg
- Battle of Chancellorsville

=== Detailed service ===
==== 1861 ====
- Departed New York May 26
- Occupation of Newport News May 29
- Action at Big Bethel, Va., June 10
- Duty at Camp Hamilton and Newport News, Va., till June, 1862

==== 1862 ====
- Action between Monitor and Merrimac in Hampton Roads March 8, 1862
- Joined Army of the Potomac on the Peninsula June 5
- Actions near Fair Oaks June 20, 23 and 24
- Oak Grove, near Fair Oaks, June 25
- Seven days before Richmond June 25-July 1
- About Fair Oaks June 26–29
- Peach Orchard and Savage Station June 29
- White Oak Swamp and Glendale June 30.
- Malvern Hill July 1
- Duty at Harrison's Landing till August 16
- Movement to Fortress Monroe, thence to Centreville August 16–27
- Pope's Campaign in Northern Virginia August 28-September 2
- Battle of Groveton August 29
- Bull Run August 30
- Duty in the Defenses of Washington, D. C, till October 11
- March up the Potomac to Leesburg, thence movement to Falmouth, Va., October 11-November 23
- Battle of Fredericksburg December 12–15.

==== 1863 ====
- "Mud March" January 20–24, 1863.
- At Falmouth till April 27
- Chancellorsville Campaign April 27-May 6
- Battle of Chancellorsville May 1–5
- Mustered out May 25, 1863, expiration of term.

== Total strength and casualties ==
The regiment suffered 79 enlisted men who were killed in action or mortally wounded and 3 officers and 31 enlisted men who died of disease, for a total of 113 fatalities.

== Commanders ==
- Colonel William H. Allen
- Colonel Garret Dyckman
- Colonel John Frederick Pierson

== See also ==
- List of New York Civil War regiments
