= Helen Morgan Hamilton =

Socialite and army officer (1896–1985)

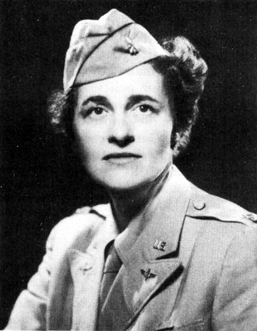

Deputy Director of the Women's Army Corps
- In office 1945 – 1947
- Preceded by: Westray Boyce

Personal details
- Born: June 12, 1896 Ramapo, New York, U.S.
- Died: January 25, 1985 (aged 88) Mystic, Connecticut, U.S.
- Spouses: Arthur Hale Woods (m. 1916; died 1942) Warren Randolph Burgess (m. 1955; died 1978)
- Relations: See Hamilton and Morgan family
- Children: 4
- Parent(s): William Pierson Hamilton; Juliet Pierpont Morgan
- Awards: Legion of Merit; Army Commendation Medal

Military service
- Allegiance: United States
- Branch/service: United States Army
- Rank: Lieutenant colonel

Helen Morgan Hamilton (June 12, 1896 – January 25, 1985) was an American Army Officer, serving as deputy director of and ultimately achieving the rank of Lieutenant colonel of the Women's Auxiliary Army Corps. She is also the granddaughter of investment banker J.P. Morgan and a descendant of U.S. Founding Father Alexander Hamilton.

== Early life ==
Hamilton was born in Ramapo, New York, the eldest child of William Pierson Hamilton (1869–1950) and Juliet Pierpont Morgan (1870–1952). Her siblings included Pierpont Morgan Hamilton (1898–1982), Laurens Morgan Hamilton (1900–1978), Alexander Morgan Hamilton (1903–1970), and Elizabeth Schuyler Hamilton (1908–1919). She grew up at the family's estate "Table Rock" in Sloatsburg, New York.

Her paternal grandfather was William Gaston Hamilton (1832–1913), a consulting engineer of the Pennsylvania Railroad Company who was the son of John Church Hamilton (1792−1882) and grandson of the first Treasury Secretary, Alexander Hamilton. Her maternal grandparents were Fanny (née Tracy) Morgan (1842–1924) and John Pierpont Morgan (1837–1913).

== Career ==
In the late 1930s, Helen was involved with the historic preservation of colonial Williamsburg, Virginia and was a founding trustee of the National Trust for Historic Preservation in 1953. She served as president of the Foundation for the Preservation of Historic Georgetown, and a fellow of the Pierpont Morgan Library in New York.

During World War II, after the death of her first husband, she entered the United States Army and was active in the formation of the Women's Auxiliary Army Corps, serving as deputy director, achieving the rank of Lieutenant colonel. In 1947, she was appointed consultant to Robert P. Patterson, U.S. Secretary of War, in connection with the proposed universal military training program. In this role, she advised Lt. Gen. Raymond S. McLain on matters pertaining to parents' interests in the proposed program.

In 1949, she became director of the public liaison of the Economic Cooperation Administration, which administered the Marshall Plan. She served in that post for two years until she then completed a survey for the Fund for Adult Education for the Ford Foundation.

In 1953, Helen helped Hamilton College place her great-great-grandfather Alexander Hamilton's desk, on which he wrote his part of The Federalist Papers, on permanent exhibition. She was introduced by the college's president, Robert Ward McEwen, who noted that the college awarded an honorary doctor of laws degree to Hamilton's son in 1861 and grandson, Dr. Allan McLane Hamilton, in 1912, who had gifted the desk to the college.

In 1959, she served on the United States Committee for the Atlantic Congress.

== Personal life ==
On June 10, 1916, Hamilton married Arthur Hale Woods (1870–1942), who was the New York City Police Commissioner. They moved to Washington when Woods served in the War Department. Before Woods's death in 1942, Hamilton had four children:

- John Pierpont Woods (1918–2012), who married Claire Warren Streeter (1920–2006), daughter of Edward Streeter, in 1947. They divorced in 1953, and in 1954, he married Joan Holden, daughter of Hale Holden Jr. of Pittsfield, Massachusetts.
- Leonard Hamilton Woods, who married Anina Paepcke, the daughter of Walter Paepcke and Elizabeth Nitze (the sister of Paul Nitze) of Chicago, in 1948. They divorced and in 1963, she married Ian Morgan Hamilton (1923–2010), Leonard's first cousin through his uncle, Pierpont Morgan Hamilton.
- Alexander Hamilton Woods
- Carolie Frances Woods (1927–2008), who married Valentine Hollingsworth Jr., in 1948. She later married Marshall Hays Noble (1923–2002).

On March 5, 1955, Hamilton married the banker and diplomat Warren Randolph Burgess (1889–1978), who was serving as the Undersecretary of the Treasury for Monetary Affairs in the Eisenhower administration and later was the Ambassador to the North Atlantic Treaty Organization. They remained married until his death in 1978.

Helen died of cardiac arrest at the age of 88 on January 25, 1985, in Mystic, Connecticut.

=== Residence ===
In 1915, Hamilton purchased the Georgetown home of Robert Todd Lincoln and lived there until 1984.
