= Warren Randolph Burgess =

American banker and diplomat

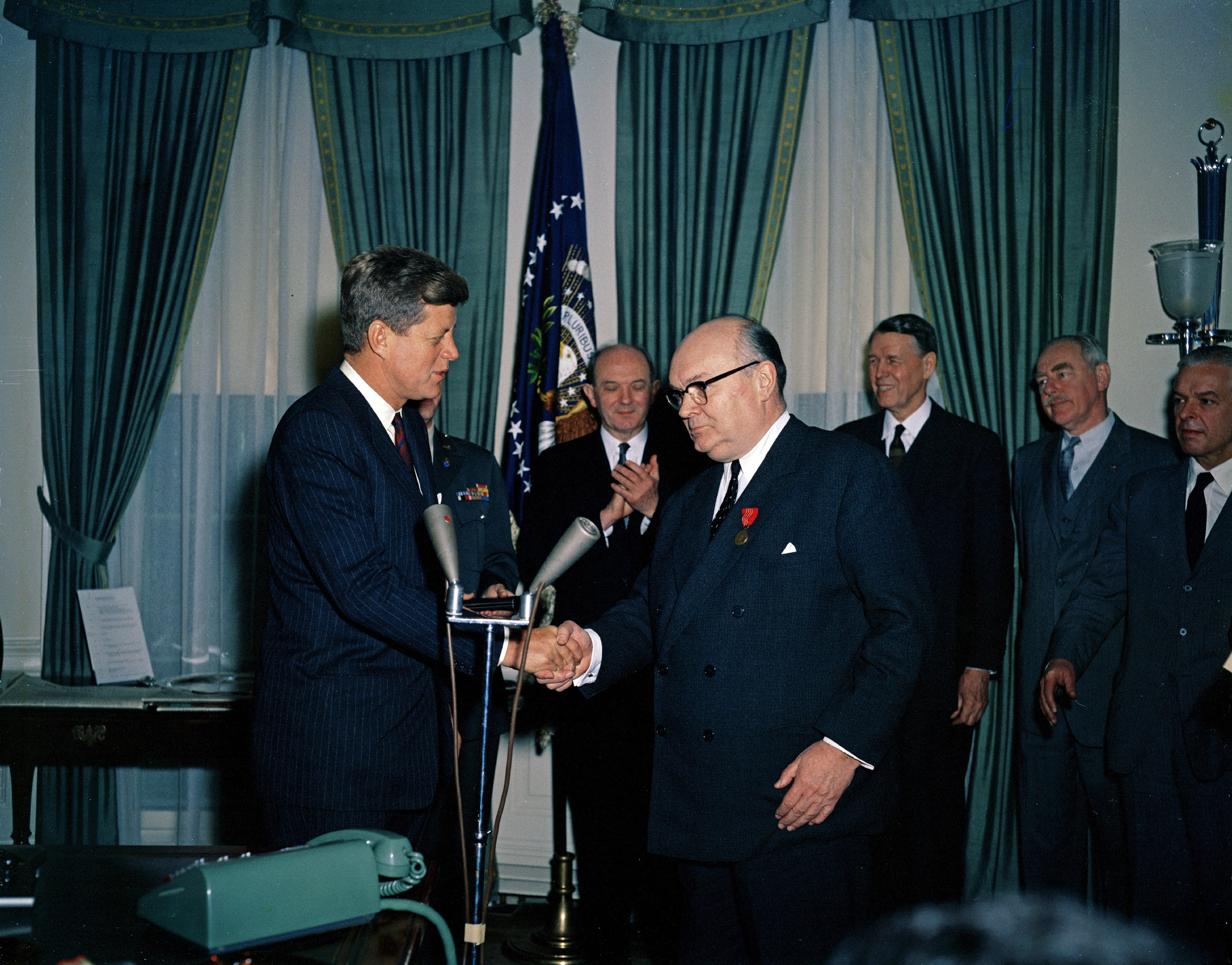
- Burgess (third from the right), during the presentation of the Medal of Freedom to Secretary General of the North Atlantic Treaty Organization (NATO) Paul-Henri Spaak by President John F. Kennedy

4th United States Permanent Representative to NATO
- In office September 21, 1957 – March 23, 1961
- Appointed by: Dwight D. Eisenhower
- Preceded by: George Walbridge Perkins, Jr.
- Succeeded by: Thomas K. Finletter

Personal details
- Born: May 7, 1889 Newport, Rhode Island, U.S.
- Died: September 16, 1978 (aged 89) Washington, D.C., U.S.
- Party: Republican
- Spouses: May Ayres (m. 1917; div. 1953); Helen Morgan Hamilton (m. 1955)
- Children: 2
- Education: Brown University; McGill University; Columbia University

Warren Randolph Burgess (May 7, 1889 – September 16, 1978) was an American banker and diplomat who served as the U.S. Ambassador to NATO from 1957 to 1961.

== Early life ==
Burgess was born in Newport, Rhode Island (where his father was teaching at the Rogers High School) and grew up in the Chicago, Illinois, area. He was the son of Isaac Bronson Burgess, a Philips Exeter Academy and Brown University graduate who was a teacher, and Ellen (née Wilber) Burgess, an Abbot Academy graduate. His elder brother was Robert Wilbur Burgess (b. 1887), who served as Director of the United States Census Bureau from 1953 to 1961.

Burgess attended Brown University and joined the Delta Upsilon fraternity. He did graduate work at McGill University in Montreal and earned a doctorate from Columbia University in 1920. His dissertation at Columbia was entitled "Trends of School Costs."

== Career ==
He became a prominent banker in New York City. In 1920, as a statistician, he joined the Federal Reserve Bank of New York and remained with the bank for 19 years until he resigned in 1938 as vice president in charge of the Banks government security operation. In 1927, he published "The Reserve Banks and the Money Markets." In 1938, he joined National City Bank of New York (now known as Citibank) becoming vice chairman of the board of directors; later becoming chairman of the Bank's executive committee.

Burgess was elected to the American Philosophical Society in 1942. He was elected President of the American Bankers Association and served in that role until 1945, when he was succeeded by Frank C. Rathje. In 1930, he was elected as a Fellow of the American Statistical Association.

=== Public service ===
In 1953, Dwight D. Eisenhower appointed Burgess deputy to the United States Secretary of the Treasury George M. Humphrey and Burgess settled in Washington. The following year in 1954, he was appointed Undersecretary of the Treasury, again by Eisenhower.

In 1957, Eisenhower appointed Burgess to succeed George Walbridge Perkins, Jr. as the United States Permanent Representative to NATO (the North Atlantic Treaty Organization), and he served in this role until 1961 when John F. Kennedy was elected President and appointed Thomas K. Finletter as his replacement. In this capacity he participated in the Bilderberg Conferences in 1958 and 1959.

== Personal life ==
In 1917, he married Dr. May Ayres (1888–1953), director of nursing education and a statistician. Together, they were the parents of two sons:

- Leonard Randolph Burgess, an author.
- Julian Ayres Burgess (1921–2008), a former aerospace engineer who married illustrator and painter Virginia McIntyre in 1951.

After the death of his first wife and while he was serving as the Undersecretary of the Treasury for Monetary Affairs, he married Helen Morgan Hamilton (1896–1985), granddaughter of banker J.P. Morgan and widow of Arthur Hale Woods on March 5, 1955. During the war, she served in the Women's Army Corps, rising to the rank of Lt. Colonel.

Burgess died at his home in Washington, D.C., on September 16, 1978. His widow later died on January 25, 1985, in Mystic, Connecticut. He was buried in Arlington National Cemetery.

Diplomatic posts
Preceded by George W. Perkins	U.S. Ambassador to NATO; 1957–1961	Succeeded by Thomas K. Finletter
