= Rob Nichols =

American lobbyist and association executive

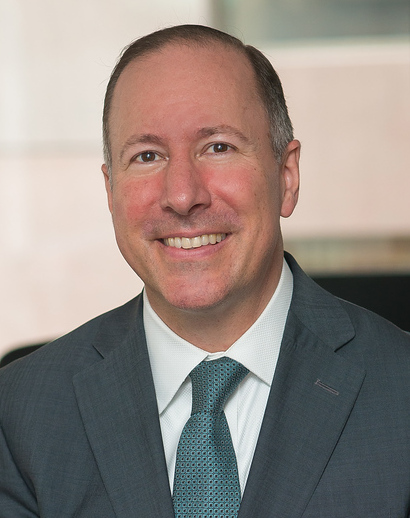
- Born: January 3, 1969 (age 57); Camden, New Jersey
- Occupation: Financial services trade association executive
- Known for: Assistant Secretary of the Treasury for Public Affairs (2003–2005); President and CEO, Financial Services Forum (2005–2015); President and CEO, American Bankers Association (2016–present)

Robert Stanley Nichols (born January 3, 1969) is an American association executive and former public official. He is currently the president and CEO of the American Bankers Association. He was previously president and CEO of the Financial Services Forum from 2005 to 2015 and an assistant secretary at the U.S. Treasury Department during the George W. Bush administration.

== Early life, education and career ==
Nichols was born in Camden, New Jersey, in 1969. He was raised in Seattle and moved to Washington, D.C., to attend George Washington University. He is a Sigma Alpha Epsilon Alumni Association member.

After graduation in 1991, he worked in the White House in the George H. W. Bush administration and served as an aide to then-Transportation Secretary Andy Card. After the Bush administration ended, Nichols held positions with the Washington state Republican Party; as a senior aide for the late Rep. Jennifer Dunn and former Sen. Slade Gorton. In 1995, he married his wife, Rebecca, whom he met at GWU. They have two children.

== Treasury Department ==
In early 2001, Nichols was named deputy assistant Treasury secretary for public affairs in the George W. Bush administration, serving as the Treasury Department's spokesman. In April 2003, Bush nominated Nichols as assistant secretary for public affairs. He was confirmed in August 2003 and sworn in by Treasury Secretary John Snow.

== Financial Services Forum ==
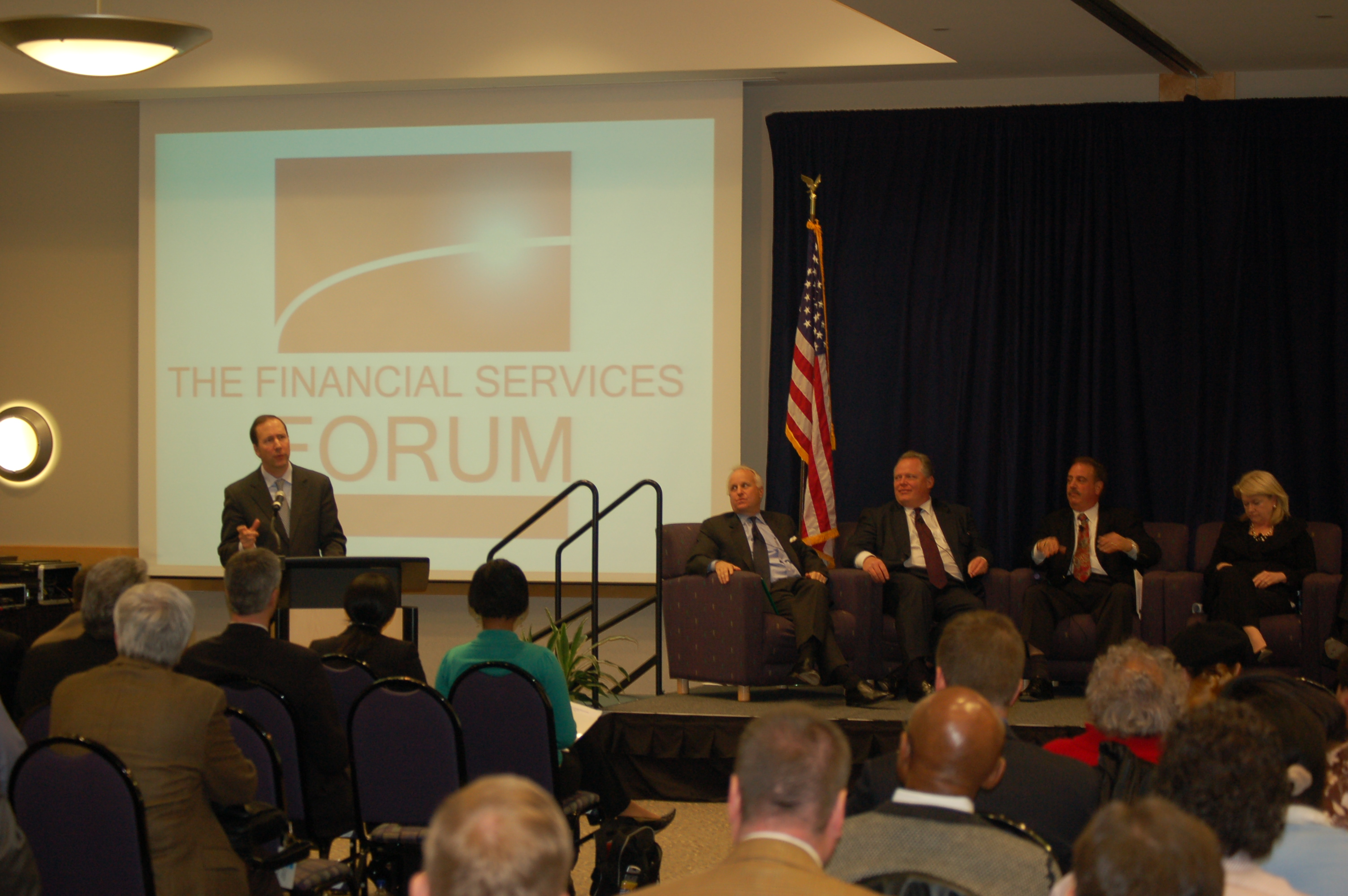
Nichols speaks at a 2008 Financial Services Forum event in Charlotte, North Carolina.

In 2005, Nichols became president and CEO of the Financial Services Forum, then based in New York City. The forum represents 18 CEOs of America's largest financial firms, including banks, insurers, and asset managers.

== American Bankers Association ==
In May 2015, Nichols was named president and CEO of the American Bankers Association, the nation’s largest trade group representing banks of all sizes. During his tenure as CEO, several bills and regulatory proposals supported by ABA have been enacted, including the Tax Cuts and Jobs Act of 2017 and the first major banking reform bill since the Dodd-Frank Act, the bipartisan Economic Growth, Regulatory Relief, and Consumer Protection Act (S. 2155). In 2019, Nichols was a vocal advocate for the SAFE Banking Act, which would allow banks to serve the cannabis industry. With ABA’s support, the legislation was passed by the House with a bipartisan vote in September 2019.

Nichols also reorganized ABA’s political engagement strategy, with the association producing ads endorsing congressional candidates for the first time—both Republicans and Democrats—and increasing its political activity in the 2020 campaign cycle. “Our goal is to support candidates who understand and appreciate the critical role banks of all sizes play in the economy,” Nichols said, according to the Wall Street Journal. “We plan to expand our efforts in 2020 on a rigorously bipartisan basis.”

Nichols also announced ABA efforts to help banks innovate, including the association’s first direct investments in fintech companies. At ABA’s annual convention in 2018, he challenged large core processing firms to improve the services they provide to community banks, especially when it comes to implementing mobile banking, real-time payments and other services customers are demanding.

Preceded by Michele Davis	Assistant Secretary of the Treasury for Public Affairs; 2003–2005	Succeeded by Tony Fratto
Preceded by Frank Keating	President and CEO of the American Bankers Association; 2016–present	Succeeded by incumbent
