= Caleb Tompkins =

American politician

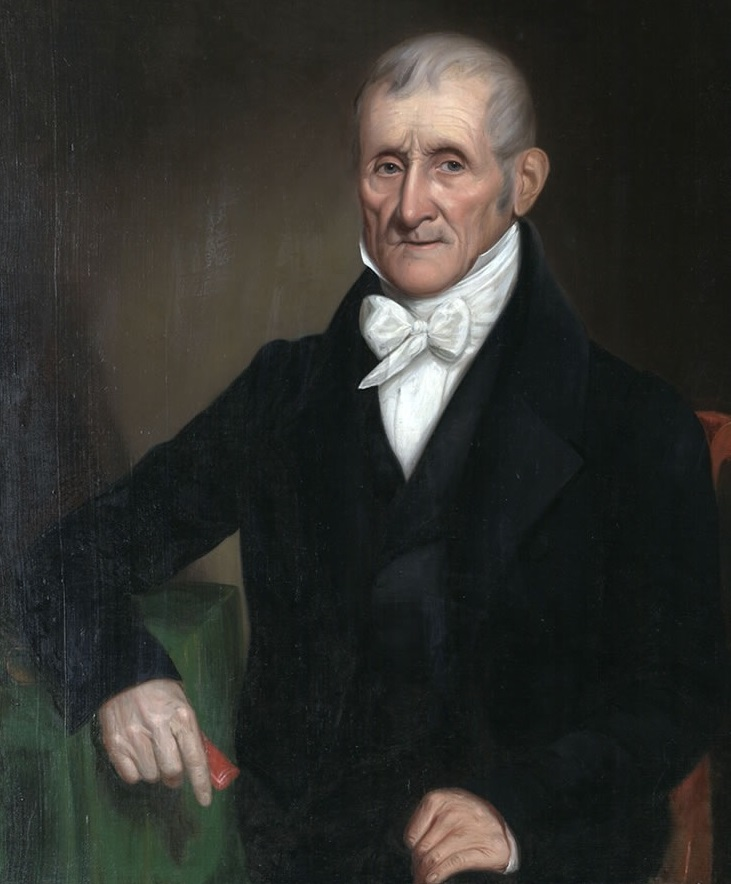

Member of the U.S. House of Representatives from New York's 3rd district
- In office March 4, 1817 – March 4, 1821
- Preceded by: Jonathan Ward
- Succeeded by: Jeremiah H. Pierson

Member of the New York State Assembly for Westchester County
- In office 1804–1806

Personal details
- Born: December 22, 1759 Scarsdale, Province of New York, British America
- Died: January 1, 1846 (aged 86) Scarsdale, New York, U.S.
- Resting place: First Presbyterian Church Cemetery, White Plains, New York, United States
- Party: Republican
- Other political affiliations: Anti-Federalism; Democratic-Republican
- Relatives: Daniel D. Tompkins (brother)

Caleb Tompkins (December 22, 1759 – January 1, 1846) was a U.S. representative from New York, and the brother of Vice President Daniel D. Tompkins.

== Early life ==
Caleb Tompkins was born on the Fox Meadows estate near Scarsdale in the Province of New York on December 22, 1759, and was the eldest son of Jonathan G. Tompkins, a prominent judge and landowner. He was educated locally, and trained for a legal career.

== American Revolution ==
Tompkins served as a private in the 2nd Regiment of Westchester County Militia (Thomas's Regiment) during the American Revolution. In October 1776 he fled his home to escape British troops, successfully evading capture by submerging himself in a nearby swamp. This incident was known to James Fenimore Cooper, who used a fictionalized version of it in his 1821 novel The Spy.

Tompkins remained in the militia after the war, and was a Captain when he resigned in 1797.

== Career ==
Tompkins studied law, attained admission to the bar, and practiced in Westchester County. He also inherited Fox Meadows, where he resided throughout his life.

An Anti-Federalist who became a member of the Democratic-Republican Party and later a Democrat who identified with the Bucktails and Jacksonians, he was Scarsdale's first Town Clerk, and held other local offices including Town Supervisor.

Tompkins was a member of the New York State Assembly from 1804 to 1806. He served as Judge of the Westchester County Court from 1807 to 1820.

Tompkins was elected to the Fifteenth and Sixteenth Congresses, and served from March 4, 1817, to March 3, 1821.

In 1823 Tompkins returned to the position of Westchester County Judge, and he remained on the bench until his death. In 1828 he was an unsuccessful candidate for Congress, losing a narrow contest to Henry B. Cowles.

== Death and burial ==
Tompkins died in Scarsdale on January 1, 1846. He was interred in the First Presbyterian Church Cemetery in White Plains.

U.S. House of Representatives
Preceded by Jonathan Ward	Member of the U.S. House of Representatives from New York's 3rd congressional district 1817–1821	Succeeded by Jeremiah H. Pierson
