= Frank C. Rathje =

American banker

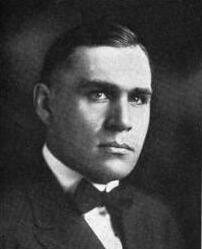
Frank Rathje

Frank Rathje (August 20, 1882 – February 24, 1967) was a Chicago banker who served as president of the American Bankers Association and the Illinois Bankers' Association during World War II. He founded the Mutual National Bank of Chicago and the Chicago City Bank and Trust Company.

== Childhood and education ==
Frank C. Rathje was born on August 20, 1882, in Bloomingdale, Illinois, to Louisa (née Ehlers) and William Rathje of Hanover, Germany. He attended St. John's Northwestern Military Academy in 1903 but was forced to drop out due to a lack of funding. In 1959, St. John's Northwestern presented him with an honorary degree.

Rathje attended night classes at Northwestern University Law School where he received his Juris Doctor. One of his first cases was before judge and Commissioner of Baseball, Kenesaw Mountain Landis. On June 19, 1946, he was given an Honorary Doctorate of Business Administration by Northwestern University. He also received an Honorary Doctorate from Monmouth College.

== Career ==
Rathje founded the Mutual National Bank of Chicago, Illinois, in 1917. Upon Rathje's death, the bank merged with the LaSalle Bank. Rathje was simultaneously President of the Chicago City Bank and Trust Company. These banks were 2 of the 34 Chicago banks that were allowed by the U.S. Treasury to remain open during The Great Depression and after the banking moratorium in 1933. Rathje is credited with predicting the imminent economic collapse. He prevented a run on his banks by raising capital through the sale of bonds and commercial real estate. These achievements led Rathje to be elected president of the American Bankers Association in 1945, succeeding Warren Randolph Burgess of New York City. In this capacity, Rathje would consult with President Harry S. Truman and his cabinet regarding economic recovery strategies.

Rathje served as President of the Transportation Association of America and was a member of the Chicago Plan Commission from 1937 to 1954 after the passing of former commissioner Charles Wacker.

Rathje's philosophy of success was expressed in five words: fairness, frankness, foresight, force, and faith.

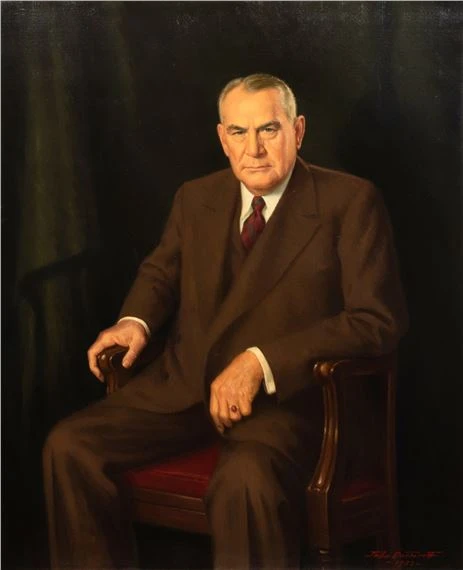
Portrait of Frank C. Rathje by John Doctoroff

== Personal life ==
Rathje married Josephine Logan of New York City on October 16, 1915, and had four children: Theron, Josephine, Shirley, and Frank Jr. who was the Chairman of Illinois Valley Bancshares, the namesake of Rathje Hall at Grinnell College and Rathje Track in Princeton, Illinois. Frank Rathje, Jr., died in Fond du Lac, Wisconsin on May 10, 2012. He was an uncle of Sue Rathje Block and John Rusling Block, the former United States Secretary of Agriculture for President Ronald Reagan.

Rathje was a philanthropist in the Chicago area. He left much of his estate to the Glenwood School for Boys and Girls located in Glenwood, Illinois. Glenwood dedicated the St. Charles, Illinois, campus to the Rathje family in 2000, naming it the Rathje Campus. He served as President of the Union League Club of Chicago and contributed to much of the club's current art collection including the portrait of Abraham Lincoln by John Doctoroff. Mr. Rathje's in-laws, Frank and Josephine Logan, were philanthropists who awarded the Art Institute of Chicago's Logan Medal of the Arts annually. Recipients of the Logan Medal include Edward Hopper, Andy Warhol and Willem de Kooning. He was a member of the Freemasonry, Medinah Temple, Beverly Country Club, South Shore Country Club and The Chicago Club.

Rathje was an avid hunter and fisherman having hunted in every state west of the Mississippi River and many countries around the world. He served as President of the Big Sand Lake Hunting and Fishing Club in Phelps, Wisconsin and was a member of the Adventurers' Club of Chicago, a spin-off of the Adventurers' Club of New York.

Rathje owned several cattle and grain farms in rural Illinois. He served as President of the Percheron Horse Association of America and was a member of the Saddle and Sirloin club.
