= American Bankers Association =

American trade association for banking

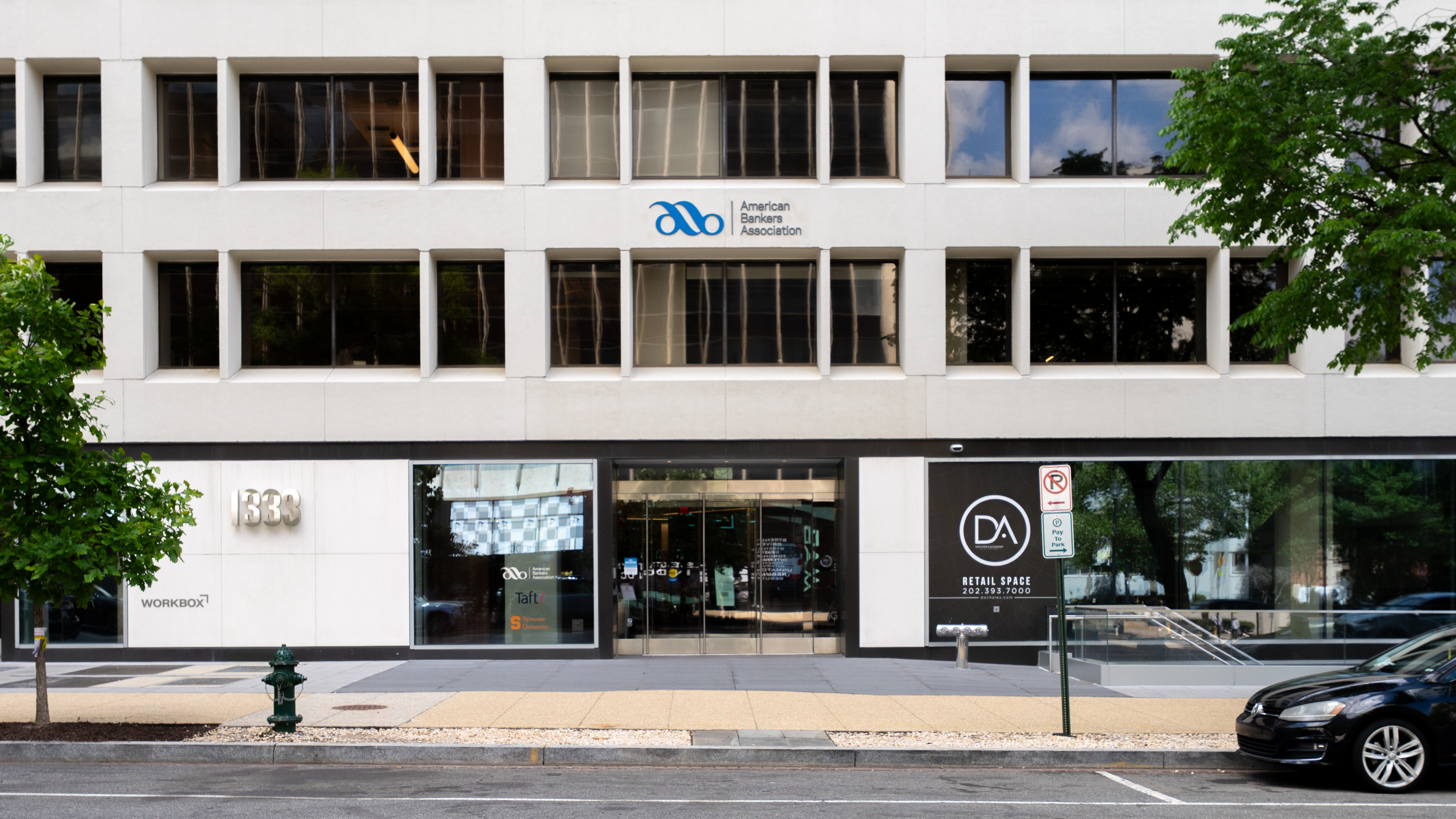
- Headquarters in Washington, D.C.
- Abbreviation: ABA
- Formation: 1875 in Saratoga Springs, New York, U.S.
- Type: Industry trade group Professional association Advocacy group
- Tax ID no.: 52-1001304
- Legal status: 501(c)(6)
- Location: Washington, D.C., U.S.
- Region served: United States
- President and CEO: Rob Nichols
- Chair: Julie Thurlow
- Revenue: $135,325,103 (2019)
- Website: aba.com

The American Bankers Association (ABA) is an American trade association for the U.S. banking industry, founded in 1875. They lobby for banks of all sizes and bank charters, including community banks, regional and money center banks, Federal savings associations, mutual savings banks, and trust companies. The average member bank has approximately $250 million in assets. ABA is the largest financial trade group in the United States.

The group offers training, certification, news, research, advocacy, and community for bankers and members of the financial services in America. It publishes ABA Banking Journal.

== History ==
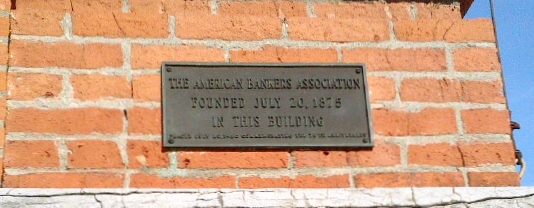
A plaque marks the building where the ABA was first organized in 1875, Saratoga Springs, New York.

The origins of the American Bankers Association are in the Panic of 1873, when St. Louis, Missouri banker James Howenstein found himself in "a tight squeeze," with only a few hundred dollars in funds and millions of deposits to pay. Relying on help and intelligence from peer bankers in the form of frequent correspondence, Howenstein escaped his dilemma and realized the value of a bankers' fraternal organization.

Howenstein later recalled:

The 1873 panic was a well spring of subject matter for correspondence and we cashiers availed of it for the general information. We were acquaintances before we had seen more of each other than handwriting; we were friends before we knew it. But the time had now come for something better. With our pens we had wished each other the good cheer of a Merry Christmas and a Happy New Year, and that scarcely discharged the pensiveness of our unrelief of bank work. We wanted to meet each other. The desire possessed us to engage the mind for a season in new and restful and indeed educational objects to mitigate and counteract the despotism of money; to make some dividends out of our lifetime and set apart some days in the year to the extinguishment of bad debts which the eager pursuit of business had imposed on nature, to pause at regular intervals to put aside something to rest-fund.

Howenstein convened a group of 17 bankers in New York City on May 24, 1875. They planned the first convention for the new American Bankers Association, which opened on July 20, 1875, in Saratoga Springs, New York, with 349 bankers representing 31 states and the District of Columbia. The initial constitution called for the association to:

Promote the general welfare and usefulness of banks and banking institutions, and to secure uniformity of action, together with the practical benefits to be derived from personal acquaintance and from the discussion of subjects of importance to the banking and commercial interests of the country, and especially in order to secure the proper consideration of questions regarding the financial and commercial usages, customs and laws which affect the banking interests of the entire country, and for protection against loss by crime.

The ABA founded the American Institute of Banking in 1900. The institute which provided a path to careers in banking without collegiate training in finance and law also provided professional education via examinations and certificates through local chapters.

The ABA, first headquartered in New York City, organized its activities through sections focused on particular bank types. The trust company section was organized in 1896, followed by one for clearing houses in 1899, savings banks in 1902, and state bankers associations in 1908. The ABA's growth continued with the emergence of the Federal Reserve System, which required national banks to be members of a Federal Reserve Bank and provided the option to state-chartered banks. In 1915, the ABA organized a section for national banks and an additional section for state banks in 1916. To facilitate advocacy before the Comptroller of the Currency, the national bank section opened the ABA's first office in Washington, D.C., in 1919. The state bank section also used the Washington office to represent its banks' interest before the Federal Reserve.

In 1925, to commemorate the ABA's 50th anniversary, the ABA organized an Educational Foundation, with bankers and state associations contributing an initial $400,000 to provide scholarships to study banking, finance, and economics.

The 1930s saw an expansion of the ABA's professional development activities led by Harold Stonier, ABA's executive, from 1937 to 1952. Stonier founded the ABA Graduate School of Banking at Rutgers University in 1935 with 220 students. The school later moved to Wharton School of the University of Pennsylvania, and in 2007, the Graduate School was named after Stonier. ABA launched other professional development programs in the years that followed, including for bank marketers, regulatory compliance officers, trust bankers, and commercial lenders.

The 1933 Banking Act established the Federal Deposit Insurance Corporation, separated commercial banking from investment banking under the Glass-Steagall Act, and the Bank Holding Company Act of 1956 brought additional Federal Reserve oversight to bank holding companies. With these changes in the industry, the ABA consolidated its operations in its current Washington, D.C. location in 1971, closing the New York office.

The ABA achieved a major goal with the passage of the Gramm-Leach-Bliley Act in November 1999. Noting that "bankers urgently needed new competitive tools to serve their customers," ABA's executive vice president at the time, Donald Ogilvie, attributed the law's passage to "the deliberate actions of many bankers asking their members of Congress to take action now" and the ABA and state bankers association officers and leaders who "patiently lobbied, cajoled, and bargained with one Congress after another to help make financial modernization a reality."

In December 2007—eight years after an earlier, abortive attempt—the ABA merged with America's Community Bankers to form the largest trade association in the financial industry, representing, at that time, 95 percent of the banking industry's assets. Over several years, the merger saw the combination of many activities, including the merger two for-profit subsidiaries that provided products and services to members and the integration of the ABA's Education Foundation with the affordable housing activities and Habitat for Humanity partnership of ACB.

== Leadership ==
The ABA's activities are overseen by a board of directors consisting of several bankers, representing institutions of all sizes. The association is led by four volunteer banker officers and a paid president and CEO, and the offices of chairman, chairman-elect, and vice chairman rotate annually.

Previous notable ABA officers include:

- George Fisher Baker, ABA treasurer from 1875 to 1895, co-founder of the First National Bank of New York in 1863, and patron of Harvard Business School.
- Charles Parsons, sixth president of the ABA in 1888, President of the State Bank of St. Louis. Author, art collector, philanthropist.
- Lyman J. Gage, ABA president from 1883 to 1886 and U.S. Treasury Secretary from 1897 to 1902.
- Joseph C. Hendrix, U.S. Representative from 1893 to 1895 and ABA president from 1897 to 1898.
- Francis Henry Fries, textiles businessman and ABA trust company division president from 1911 to 1912.
- Robert Maddox, Mayor of Atlanta from 1909 to 1911 and ABA president from 1918 to 1919.
- Walter W. Head, ABA president from 1923 to 1924 and national president of the Boy Scouts of America from 1926 to 1946.
- Melvin Alvah Traylor, ABA president from 1926 to 1927 and co-founder of the Bank of International Settlements.
- Warren Randolph Burgess, ABA president from 1944 to 1945 and Permanent Representative to NATO from 1957 to 1961.
- Frank C. Rathje, ABA president from 1945 to 1946.
- Joseph Dodge, chairman of the predecessor to Comerica and ABA president from 1947 to 1948.
- Sam M. Fleming, ABA president from 1961 to 1962 and chairman of SunTrust Nashville.
- Mark W. Olson, ABA president from 1986 to 1987, Federal Reserve Board governor from 2001 to 2006, and chairman of the Public Company Accounting Oversight Board from 2006 to 2009.
- Elizabeth A. Duke, the first female ABA chairman from 2004 to 2005 and Federal Reserve Board governor from 2007 to 2013.
- Steve Wilson, ABA chairman from 2010 to 2011 and an Ohio state senator from 2017 to the present.
- Frank Keating, governor of Oklahoma from 1995 to 2003 and ABA president and CEO from 2011 to 2015.
- Matt Williams, ABA chairman from 2012 to 2013 and a Nebraska state senator from 2015 to the present.
- Rob Nichols, current ABA president and CEO.

Prior to 2002, ABA officers were known as "president," "president-elect," and "first vice president," and the association's chief executive was known as the "executive vice president."

== Membership ==
ABA members include banks of all sizes and charters, and between them they represent over 95 percent of the industry's $13.5 trillion in assets, and employ over two million.

== Advocacy ==
After the Dodd–Frank Wall Street Reform and Consumer Protection Act was signed into law by President Barack Obama on July 21, 2011, the American Bankers Association announced that it would advocate for revisions. The ABA declared that they would lobby for fewer regulations on the Volcker Rule, derivatives regulations, and other pieces of the bill.

The ABA has been a vocal opponent of the practice of credit unions buying banks, making their opposition to the practice a top priority of their advocacy and lobbying efforts.

The ABA is opposed to allowing merchants to choose between credit card transaction networks. Consumers and merchants would benefit from a reduction in fees credit card companies collect in interchange fees. Credit card fees in the US average 2-3% of the sale value, while in the EU, these hidden fees are capped at 0.3%. The ABA opposes a U.S. central bank digital currency (CBDC), ascribing high costs and risks to existing financial systems. In July 2025, the ABA issued its support of H.R. Bill 1919 Anti-CBDC Surveillance State Act, which would prohibit the Federal Reserve Banks from issuing a retail CBDC, and bar the Federal Reserve Board and the Department of Treasury from issuance of a CBDC without congressional approval.

=== State bankers associations ===
The ABA partners with 53 independent state bankers' groups through the State Bankers Association Alliance. Founded in 1885, the Texas Bankers Association became the nation's first state banking organization. By the time the Rhode Island Bankers Association was incorporated in 1915, there was an association in every state.

== Education and public outreach programs ==
The ABA Foundation, a subsidiary of the ABA, organizes outreach programs that provide financial education and financial literacy. The Programs are run by the ABA Foundation, and include:

- Get Smart About Credit
- Lights, Camera, Save!
- Safe Banking for Seniors
- Teach Children to Save

== ABA Nasdaq Index ==
The ABA NASDAQ Community Bank Index (ABAQ) is a market value-weighted stock market index composed of community-based financial institutions. The index was launched in December 2003 to bring greater visibility to community banks, and in turn, promote greater market liquidity and fairer valuations. Calculated on both a total return basis and on a price return basis under the symbol ABAQ, it is the most broadly representative stock index for community banks.
