= Alexander Morgan Hamilton =

American philanthropist

Personal details
- Born: January 25, 1903 New York City, New York, U.S.
- Died: May 29, 1970 (aged 67) London, England
- Party: Republican
- Spouse(s): Katherine Comly (m. 1930; div. 1935) Elizabeth Malcolm Peltz (m. 1935)
- Relations: Helen M. Hamilton (sister); Pierpont Hamilton (brother); J. P. Morgan (grandfather); John Hamilton (great-grandfather); Alexander Hamilton (great-great grandfather)
- Parent(s): William Pierson Hamilton; Juliet Pierpont Morgan
- Education: St. Paul's School (1921)
- Alma mater: Harvard University (1924)
- Occupation: Philanthropist

Military service
- Allegiance: United States
- Branch/service: Marine Corps
- Rank: Major
- Battles/wars: World War II

Alexander Morgan Hamilton (January 25, 1903 – May 29, 1970) was an American philanthropist and civil servant. He was the grandson of J. P. Morgan the financier, and great-great-grandson of Alexander Hamilton, the first Secretary of the Treasury of the United States.

== Early life ==
Alexander Morgan Hamilton was born on January 25, 1903, in New York City to William Pierson Hamilton (1869–1950) and Juliet Pierpont Morgan (1870–1952), one of four children born to John Pierpont Morgan (1837–1913), the financier. Through his paternal grandfather, William Gaston Hamilton (1832–1913), and his great-grandfather, John Church Hamilton, he was the great-great-grandson of Alexander Hamilton, the first United States Secretary of the Treasury, and Elizabeth Schuyler (1757–1854). His siblings included Helen Morgan Hamilton (1896–1985), Pierpont Morgan Hamilton (1898–1982), and Elizabeth Schuyler Hamilton (1908–1919).

In 1921, he graduated from St. Paul's School, and from Harvard University in 1924.

== Career ==
After graduation, Hamilton worked for a newspaper publisher, a Wall Street banking firm, and even tried his hand at producing motion pictures. In 1930, Hamilton ran an unsuccessful campaign for a State Senate seat in the 16th District of New York as a Republican. He served as the chairman of the board of the New York Young Republican Club.

Hamilton went on to serve as the Deputy Commissioner of the Department of Public Markets in New York City, earning a $1 a day, until a disagreement with Mayor Fiorello LaGuardia forced his resignation. He later went on to serve as an Assistant to the Commissioner of Sanitation. During World War II, he served as a Major in the United States Marine Corps.

He served for over 15 years as the President of the American Scenic and Historic Preservation Society, one of the oldest historic preservation groups in the United States. Under his leadership, the group assisted in preserving Hamilton Grange, the historic summer house of his great-great-grandfather, and oversaw its transfer to the National Park Service.

== Personal life ==
Hamilton was married twice. The first marriage was on June 12, 1930, to Katherine Comly (d. 1975), the daughter of Maj. Garrard Comly at St. Elizabeth's Chapel, Sterlington, New York, near Tuxedo Park. Katherine's sister, Lanier Comly, who married John Murray Mitchell, was the mother of J. Murray Mitchell Jr. (1928–1990). They divorced in 1935 and she later married James Bogart Tailer in 1936, and after their divorce, to George Townsend Adee (1874–1948), in 1946.

On December 26, 1935, the same day his divorce to his first wife was finalized in Reno, Nevada, he married the widow, Elizabeth Malcolm Peltz Warburton Wanamaker (1905–1988). Elizabeth, the daughter of George M. Dallas Peltz (d. 1929), was first married in May 1923 to Edgerton Warburton. They divorced and in August 1932, she married Warburton's cousin, Captain John Wanamaker Jr., son of Rodman Wanamaker and grandson of John Wanamaker. Wanamaker died on November 29, 1934.

Hamilton died of emphysema, on May 29, 1970, while on vacation in London.

== See also ==
- American Scenic and Historic Preservation Society
