= Walter Paepcke =

American industrialist and philanthropist (1896–1960)

- Born: June 29, 1896
- Died: April 13, 1960 (aged 63)
- Education: Latin School of Chicago
- Occupations: Businessman, philanthropist
- Spouse: Elizabeth Paepcke
- Relatives: Paul Nitze (brother-in-law)

Walter Paepcke (June 29, 1896 – April 13, 1960) was an American businessman and philanthropist who was prominent in the mid-20th century. A longtime executive of the Chicago-based Container Corporation of America, Paepcke is best noted for his founding of the Aspen Institute and the Aspen Skiing Company in the early 1950s, both of which helped transform the town of Aspen, Colorado, into an international resort destination and popularize the sport of skiing in the United States.

== Biography ==
Walter was born to Hermann, an immigrant from Mecklenburg, and Paula (Wagner) Paepcke, the daughter of German immigrants, in Chicago, Illinois. Hermann owned a lumber mill and box-making company, and young Paepcke grew up in an upper-middle-class home. He was a 1913 graduate of the Latin School of Chicago. He then began working for his father, and eventually took over the company, the Chicago Mill & Lumber, Co. After his father's death in 1922, Paepcke began producing cardboard containers and paper.

After acquiring several other manufacturing and box companies, Paepcke formed the Container Corporation of America in 1926. The company was highly successful and made boxes for Procter & Gamble, Sears Roebuck, and General Electric, among others. CCA emphasized quality products and artistry, making their boxes stand out.

Paepcke's wife, Elizabeth Paepcke, was the sister of American diplomatic figure Paul Nitze.

== Involvement with Aspen ==
In 1949 Paepcke made Aspen the site for a celebration of the 200th birthday of Johann Wolfgang von Goethe. Albert Schweitzer, José Ortega y Gasset, Thornton Wilder, and Artur Rubinstein all attended the celebration. The next year, Paepcke created what is now the Aspen Institute. Walter and Elizabeth founded the Aspen Music Festival and School in 1949, and Walter served as the festival's director until 1954 when he appointed baritone Mack Harrell to take over.

Paepcke hired Bauhaus designer Herbert Bayer and brought him to Aspen to promote the project through poster design and other design work; Paepcke was also the patron of fellow Bauhaus figure László Moholy-Nagy by financing the rebirth of the American New Bauhaus in Chicago in 1937. The New Bauhaus also had links to the Armour Institute of Technology.

== International Design Conference in Aspen ==
In 1951 he founded the seminal International Design Conference in Aspen (IDCA) to provide a forum for discussion on design, "where the human spirit can flourish." The primary IDCA objective was to connect culture with commerce by inviting both international business and industry leaders together with representatives from various commercial design fields such as industrial design, graphic design and architecture, as well as those in the fine arts and fields such as psychology, filmmaking and literature. The first conference, in June 1951, brought together over two-hundred and fifty designers and business leaders.

Speakers at the conference included business leaders Stanley Marcus, Andrew McNally III, Harley Earl, and Hans Knoll; and from the design and architecture side, Josef Albers, Louis Kahn, Charles Eames, George Nelson, Elliott Noyes, Leo Lionni, Ben Shahn, Achille Castiglioni, Lella and Massimo Vignelli, Herbert Bayer, as well as the architect and architecture critic Peter Blake. The annual conference format included keynote speakers, workshops, panel discussions and informal, social gatherings. These activities naturally integrated those from commerce and culture into settings that stimulated dialogue, debate and insights. The existence of IDCA established a key collaborative forum on the topic on managing design within corporations for the benefit of society, as well as adding value to business. IDCA was held every June in Aspen from 1951 to 2004.
