= Elizabeth Paepcke =

American philanthropist known for promoting Aspen, Colorado

- Born: August 28, 1902
- Died: June 1994 (aged 91)
- Education: Foxcroft School
- Alma mater: Art Institute of Chicago
- Occupation: Philanthropist
- Spouse: Walter Paepcke
- Parent(s): William Albert Nitze; Anna Sophia Hilken
- Relatives: Paul Nitze (brother)

Elizabeth Paepcke (28 August 1902 – June 1994) was a philanthropist and promoter of Aspen, Colorado. She was born near Baltimore, Maryland.

== Early life ==
During her father's tenure at the University of Chicago, Elizabeth was enrolled at University of Chicago Laboratory Schools. She attended until she entered a boarding school for girls in Virginia (Foxcroft School) at the age of fourteen. Later Paepcke studied painting at the Art Institute of Chicago.

== Promotion of Aspen ==
Paepcke is remembered as the Grand Dame of Aspen due to her love and promotion of the small mining town into the skiing destination it later became. Walter and Elizabeth founded the Aspen Institute and Aspen Music Festival and School in 1949, and Walter served as the festival's director until 1954 when he appointed baritone Mack Harrell to take over. The Aspen Skiing Corporation was founded in 1946, and the city quickly became a well-known resort. Aspen hosted the FIS World Championships in 1950. Paepcke with her husband Walter also played an important role in bringing the Goethe Bicentennial Convocation to Aspen in 1949. It was an event held in a newly designed tent by the architect Eero Saarinen. Due to the Paepcke's promotion and influence Aspen became an internationally known ski resort and cultural center, home of the Aspen Music Festival and School. The skiing haven continued to grow with the development of three additional ski areas, Buttermilk (1958), Aspen Highlands (1958), and Snowmass (1967). In 1968, Paepcke donated a 25-acre property to establish the Aspen Center for Environmental Studies.

== Family ==
Elizabeth Paepcke was the daughter of William Albert Nitze, a chairman of Romance Languages at the University of Chicago., and Anna Sophia Hilken. She was married to Walter Paepcke, and she was the sister of American diplomatic figure Paul Nitze.

== Later years ==
Elizabeth loved Aspen's cultural richness, but she was upset when Aspen succumbed to the low life that undermined the true heart and soul of her beloved community. When interviewed late in her life, she explained how she felt, "Aspen can't be swallowed by the avariciousness of those who don't understand the reason for its existence" She died in Aspen from head injuries resulting from a fall.
