= Andrew McNally III =

American printer and publisher

Andrew McNally III FRGS (1909-2001) was an American printer and publisher. He led the company Rand McNally from 1948 to 1974.

McNally was born on August 17, 1909. He was educated at The Hill School. He graduated from Yale in 1931.

He ran the firm Rand McNally from 1948 to 1974. Under his leadership, important geographical advances were made, including the commissioning of the Robinson projection.
