= Sterlington, New York =

Sterlington
- hamlet
- Location of Sterlington in New York
- Coordinates: 41°08′43″N 74°11′20″W
- Country: United States
- State: New York
- County: Rockland

Sterlington, was a tiny community located in the Town of Ramapo, Rockland County, New York, United States located between Suffern and Sloatsburg.

The name was adopted when the post office opened in 1882. The Sterling Mountain Railway transported ore to the furnaces at sterling which was known as Sterling Junction or Pierson's Depot. Sterlington ceased when the railway ceased operation.

Quote from Catskill Archive Gazetteer:

"Sterlington, junction of the Sterling Mountain Railroad, running to Sterling Lake and mines; Sloatsburg, a small hamlet, formerly of some industrial importance. From New York, 35 and 36 miles respectively."

Possibly this location was named after the Sterling Lake mentioned in the quotation.

== See also ==
- 1958 Sterlington railroad collision
