= United Givers Fund =

Charitable fundraising campaign in the United States

United Givers Fund is the name used by several current or historical joint charitable appeals in the United States. Many of these appeals later adopted the United Way name, sometimes in conjunction with a merger with another charitable appeal.

Fundraising groups currently operating in the United States (primarily in the southeastern United States) under the United Givers Fund name include Cochran-Bleckley United Givers Fund Inc. of Cochran, Georgia and United Givers Fund of Marshall County Inc. of Lewisburg, Tennessee.
