= Pierpont M. Hamilton =

United States Army Medal of Honor recipient and general

Pierpont Morgan Hamilton MBE CvC
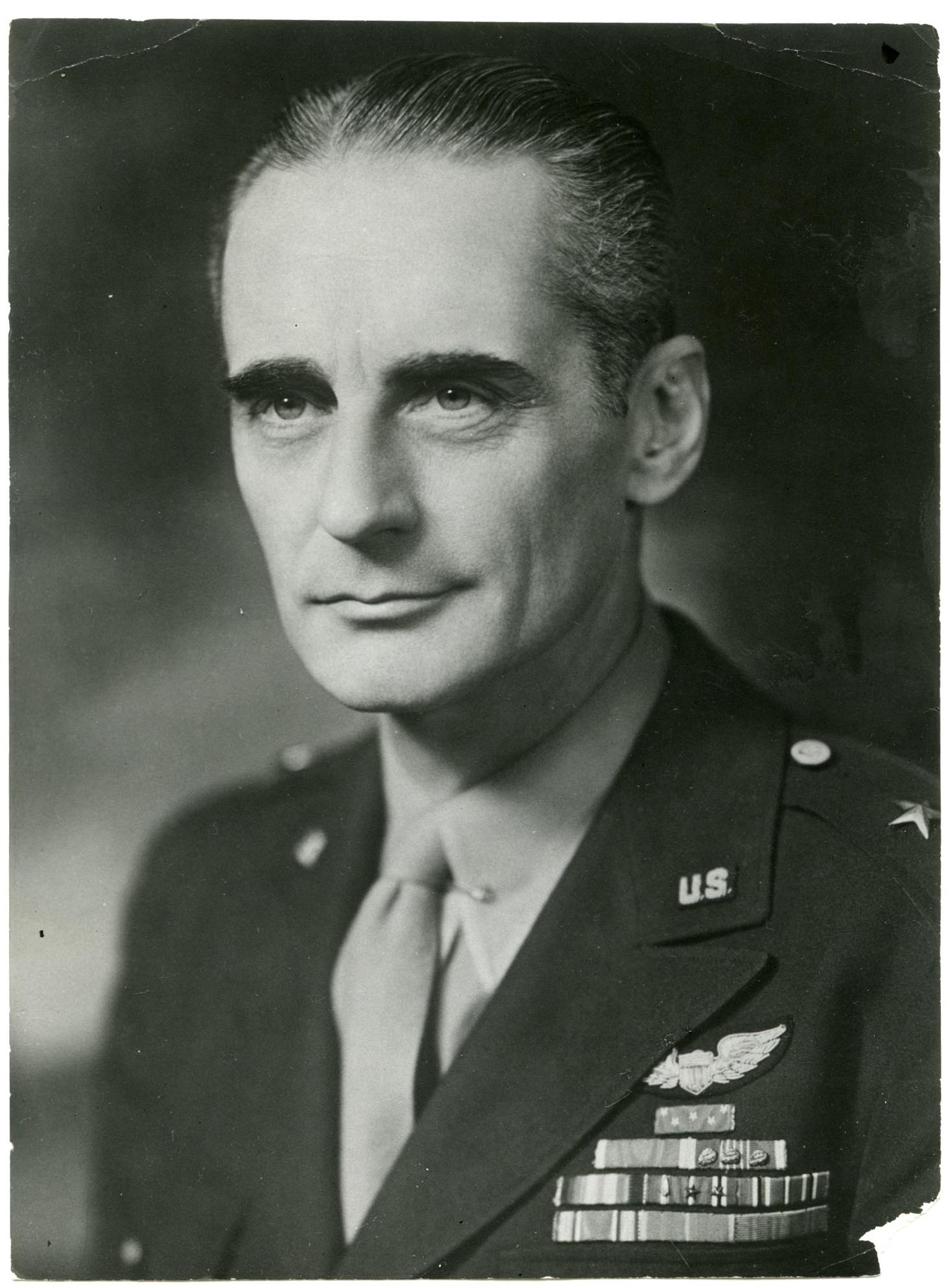
- Hamilton as a brigadier general c. 1949
- Born: August 3, 1898; Tuxedo Park, New York, U.S.
- Died: March 4, 1982 (aged 83); Los Angeles, California, U.S.
- Burial place: Santa Barbara Cemetery, Santa Barbara, California, U.S.
- Education: Harvard University
- Military career
- Allegiance: United States of America
- Branch: United States Army Air Service; United States Army Air Forces; United States Air Force
- Service years: 1917–1918; 1942–1959
- Rank: Major General
- Conflicts: World War II; Operation Torch
- Awards: Medal of Honor; Legion of Merit (2); Member of the Order of the British Empire (Great Britain); Knight of the Order of Christ (Portugal)

Pierpont Morgan Hamilton (August 3, 1898 – March 4, 1982) was a military officer in the United States Air Force, and the scion of two illustrious families in American history: the Hamilton family, which traces its lineage to founding father Alexander Hamilton, and the Morgan family, which traces its lineage to the financier and banker J. P. Morgan.

As a United States Army Air Forces officer in World War II, he was the recipient of the United States military's highest decoration, the Medal of Honor. Hamilton and Col. Demas T. Craw were the first Army Air Forces recipients of the Medal in the European-Mediterranean theater of World War II and the only AAF members to be awarded that decoration for valor not involving air combat.

== Biography ==
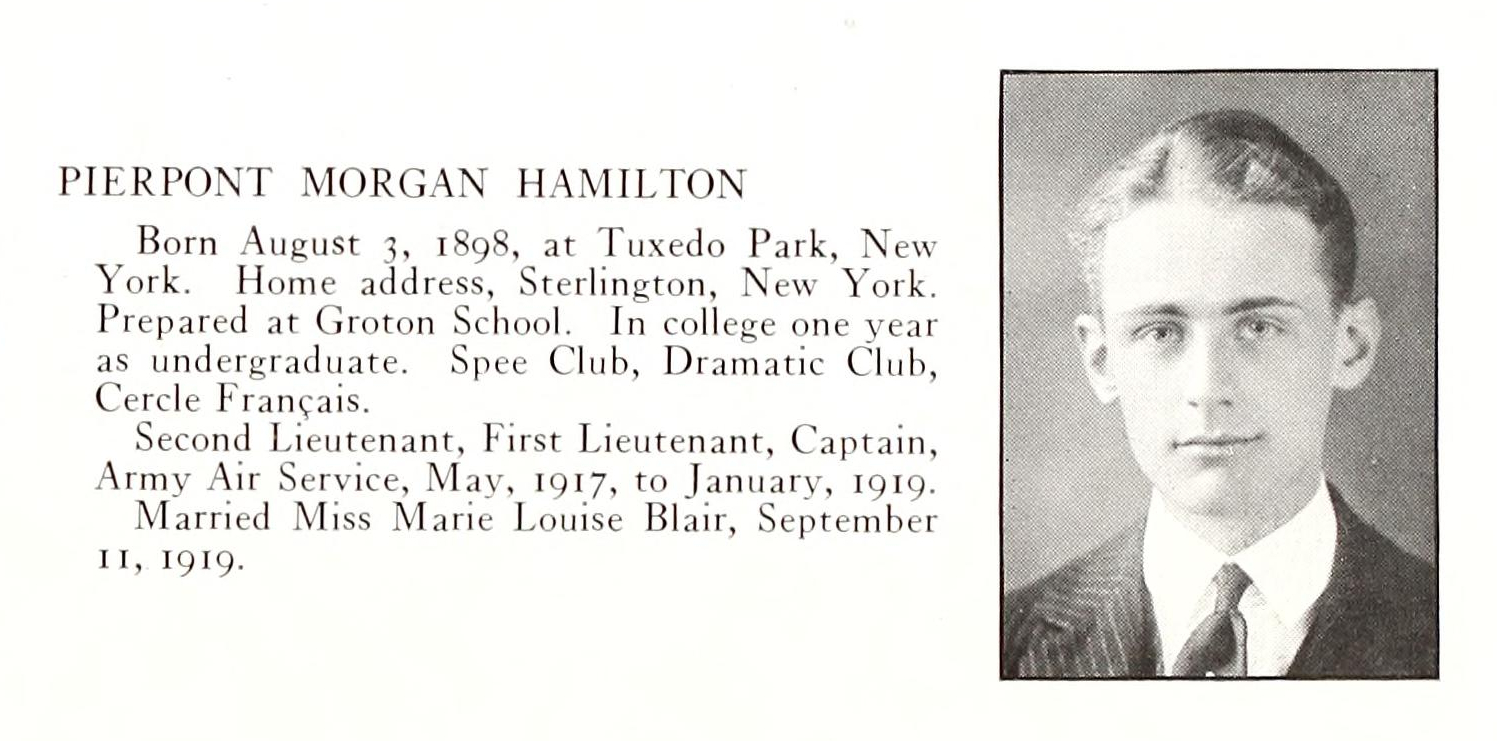
Hamilton in the Harvard Class Album, 1920

Hamilton was born in Tuxedo Park, New York on August 3, 1898, to William Pierson Hamilton (great-grandson of Alexander Hamilton) and Juliet Pierpont Morgan (daughter of John Pierpont Morgan). His siblings included Helen Morgan Hamilton, Laurens Morgan Hamilton, Alexander Morgan Hamilton, and Elizabeth Hamilton. He attended the Groton School and Harvard University, where he eventually attained both his bachelor's (1920) and master's degree (1946).

=== World War I ===
On August 7, 1917, after the United States joined World War I, he left Harvard, where he was a sophomore, to enlist as an aviation cadet, and was assigned to ground training at the School of Military Aeronautics at Cornell University. Upon his graduation on October 13, 1917, he was transferred to the Aeronautical General Supply Depot and Concentration Barracks at Hazelhurst Field, Garden City, New York, and assigned to the foreign service detachment to complete his flight training overseas. Illness prevented him from sailing with his detachment, and he was reassigned to flight training at Ellington Field, Texas, on February 6, 1918.

On May 9, 1918, he received his Reserve Military Aviator rating and was commissioned as a First Lieutenant in the Signal Officer's Reserve Corps. Hamilton served in the Air Service as an instructor in aerial navigation, meteorology, astronomy and officer-in-charge of bombing instruction at Ellington Field. Hamilton was promoted to captain on September 21, 1918. On December 31, 1918, he was honorably discharged from service.

=== Between wars ===
Hamilton married Marie Louise Blair, daughter of C. Ledyard Blair, on September 11, 1919. The wedding was held near Bernardsville, New Jersey, with a lavish reception at Blairsden Mansion. They had three children before divorcing: Philip, David and Ian. He married Rebecca Stickney on January 3, 1930. The second marriage also ended in divorce, with no children. His third and final marriage was on August 20, 1946, to Norah Goldsmith Soutter. Hamilton adopted her son Harold Moon from a previous marriage, and was a devoted stepfather to her son Nicholas Soutter, from her marriage to Lamar Soutter.

In the interwar years, he engaged in international banking, lived in France for several years, and became fluent in French. He also operated a commercial development business of patents and processes in sound and color photography.

=== World War II ===
In World War II, Hamilton applied for reappointment to the Army and was commissioned a major, Air Corps, on March 2, 1942. His first assignment was staff duty with the A-2 (Intelligence) Division, Army Air Forces Headquarters, as a liaison officer to the Royal Air Force. In June 1942 he went to London where, as an intelligence and operations officer in the Office of Combined Operations (under Lord Louis Mountbatten), he assisted in planning assaults on continental Europe, including the Dieppe Raid, and North Africa. In September 1942 he returned to Washington to discuss the plan for the North African assault (Operation Torch) with the commanding general of the Western Task Force, Major General George S. Patton. A month later he was appointed Assistant Chief of Staff (G-2) of Maj. Gen. Lucian K. Truscott's Force Goalpost, conducting the assault on western French Morocco.

=== Medal of Honor action ===
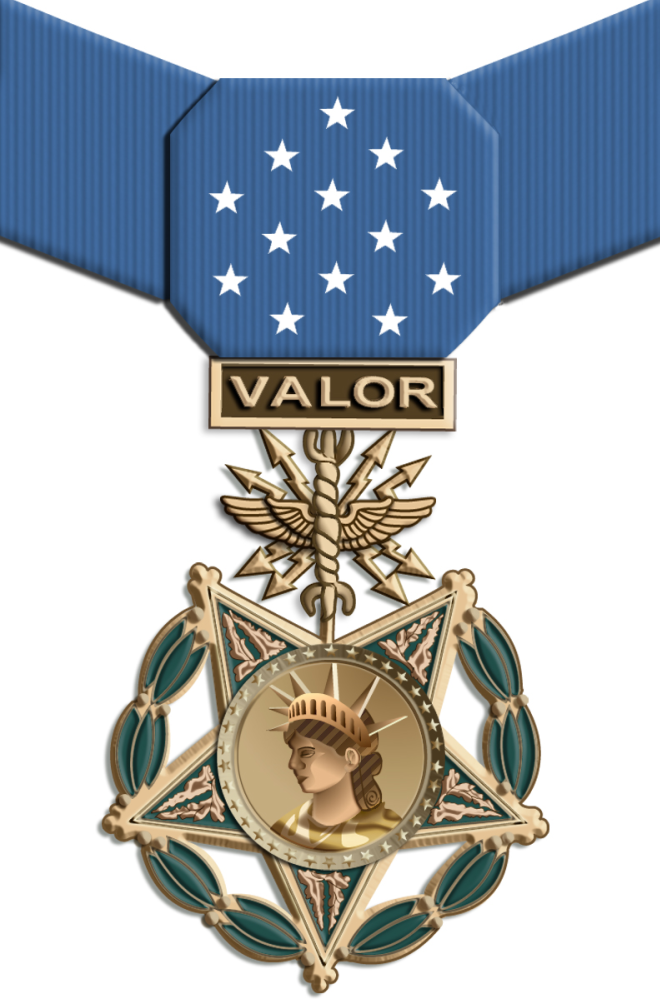
Department of the Air Force Medal of Honor

On November 8, 1942, when French forces resisted Allied landing operations, Hamilton undertook a mission for Truscott to deliver a message to the local French commander near Port Lyautey, French Morocco, to broker a cease-fire. He was joined in the mission by Col. Demas T. Craw, who volunteered to accompany Hamilton to lend the prestige of his rank to the negotiations. The officers came ashore in the first wave of Goalpost landing craft carrying troops of the 2nd Battalion, 60th Regimental Combat Team, but the alerted French defenders began shelling the force and prevented a planned landing at a jetty on the Sebou River near French headquarters.

After landing on Green Beach before dawn, still under hostile fire from shore batteries, the officers commandeered a small truck and were strafed by French aircraft when it became stuck in a muddy marsh. After the truck was extricated by a detachment of combat engineers, they attempted to continue their mission but were forced to return to the beach when caught in the exchanges of French artillery and naval gunfire from Task Group 34.8 of the United States Navy. When Truscott expressed misgivings about the mission, Craw convinced him to allow them to continue. They located a jeep and enlisted its driver, Pfc. Orris V. Correy, to cross through the French lines. Craw carried unfurled American and French flags, and Hamilton a white flag, in an attempt to safeguard their passage.

At dawn the officers reached the jetty that was to have been their original starting point. After several contacts with French troops to obtain directions, and requesting a guide (which was refused), the jeep proceeded cautiously approximately six miles into Port Lyautey. As they came over a rise on the outskirts near the French headquarters, a hidden machine gun position took them under sustained fire and killed Craw.

The two survivors were captured but Hamilton's anger at the killing of Craw under a flag of truce intimidated the French, who agreed to take him to the French command post. The local commander, Col. Charles Petit, declined to order a cease-fire but agreed to forward Hamilton's message to his immediate superior, Major General Maurice Mathenet. Fearful of the possible consequences for killing an officer traveling under a flag of truce, the French refused to allow Hamilton to communicate with his headquarters and kept him under "house arrest."

On the morning of November 10, Petit was captured by U.S. troops and ordered the 1er Regiment de Tirailleurs Marocain to surrender. Hamilton took custody of Petit, who made direct contact with Mathenet on the evening of November 10 and persuaded him to end French resistance. With the assistance of Mathenet's deputy commander, Hamilton drove to the Port Lyautey airport, which had been captured by tanks of the U.S. 70th Tank Battalion. There he relayed news of the surrender to Truscott, arranged a ceasefire at 0400 on November 11, and scheduled a formal ceremony of surrender four hours later. French Admiral Jean Darlan ordered French troops in North Africa to cease resistance. Truscott and Patton recommended both officers for the Medal of Honor, which Hamilton received on January 23, 1943. Craw was also awarded the medal posthumously later in 1943.

== Subsequent service ==
In December 1942 Hamilton became Intelligence and Air Officer for the North African Theater Advanced Headquarters at Algiers and was promoted to lieutenant colonel. The following month he was appointed Operations and Intelligence Staff Officer for the Northwest African Tactical Air Force. He returned to the United States in March 1943, was promoted to colonel on October 26, and after various assignments at AAF Headquarters in Washington and with the Joint Chiefs of Staff, was released from active duty in March 1946.

In February 1947 he returned to active duty with the Plans and Operations Division of the War Department General Staff. After the AAF became the United States Air Force, Hamilton was assigned to Headquarters USAF in the Office of Director of Plans and Operations. He became chief of the Air Force Policy Division in August 1948 and was promoted to brigadier general on December 21. He served with the United States Air Forces in Europe in both Wiesbaden and Paris in 1951, then returned to Washington D.C. for duty with the Office of the Secretary of the Air Force. Hamilton left active duty once again on March 31, 1952.

He resided in Montecito, California, and continued service in the Air Force Reserve, resuming duties with the Policy Division. Promoted to major general on June 20, 1955, he completed the Reserve and National Guard General Officer Orientation Course at the Air War College in 1957.

Following his military retirement in 1959, Hamilton held a number of civilian business positions, including an association with Electronic Products Corporation of Santa Barbara, California and as an executive with the Santa Barbara Bank & Trust until 1979, when his health deteriorated. Hamilton was admitted to the VA Wadsworth Medical Center in Los Angeles and died at age 83. Hamilton was buried in Santa Barbara Cemetery, Santa Barbara, California.

== Medal of Honor citation ==
The President of the United States of America, in the name of Congress, takes pleasure in presenting the Medal of Honor to Major (Air Corps) Pierpont Morgan Hamilton, United States Army Air Forces, for conspicuous gallantry and intrepidity in action above and beyond the call of duty while serving as the Assistant Chief of Staff for Intelligence, Western Task Force, in North Africa during the landings of Operation Torch. On 8 November 1942, near Port Lyautey, French Morocco, Lieutenant Colonel Hamilton volunteered to accompany Colonel Demas Craw on a dangerous mission to the French commander, designed to bring about a cessation of hostilities. Driven away from the mouth of the Sebou River by heavy shelling from all sides, the landing boat was finally beached at Mehdia Plage despite continuous machinegun fire from three low-flying hostile planes. Driven in a light truck toward French headquarters, this courageous mission encountered intermittent firing, and as it neared Port Lyautey a heavy burst of machinegun fire was delivered upon the truck from pointblank range, killing Colonel Craw instantly. Although captured immediately, after this incident, Lieutenant Colonel Hamilton completed the mission.

== Awards and Decorations ==
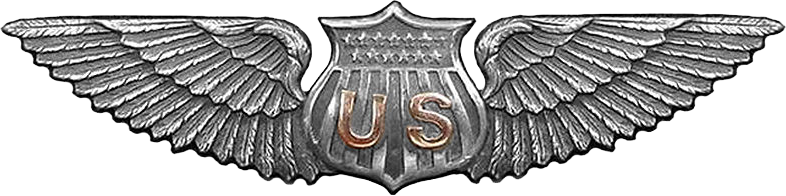

Badge	Reserve Military Aviator		
1st row	Medal of Honor	Legion of Merit with one oak leaf cluster	Army Commendation Medal with three oak leaf clusters
2nd row	Prisoner of War Medal	World War I Victory Medal	American Campaign Medal
3rd row	European–African–Middle Eastern Campaign Medal with arrowhead device and two campaign stars	World War II Victory Medal	Army of Occupation Medal
4th row	National Defense Service Medal	Air and Space Longevity Service Award with three oak leaf clusters	Armed Forces Reserve Medal

Foreign Awards

1st row	Order of the British Empire (United Kingdom)	Knight of the Order of Christ (Portugal)

== See also ==
- List of Medal of Honor recipients for World War II
