= Krongard =

Krongard is a surname. Notable people with the surname include:

- A. B. Krongard (born 1936), former executive director of the CIA
- Alexander Krongard (born 1962), retired United States Navy SEAL
- Howard Krongard (1940–2023), American government official
