= Cliff Seagroves =

American diplomat (born 1976)

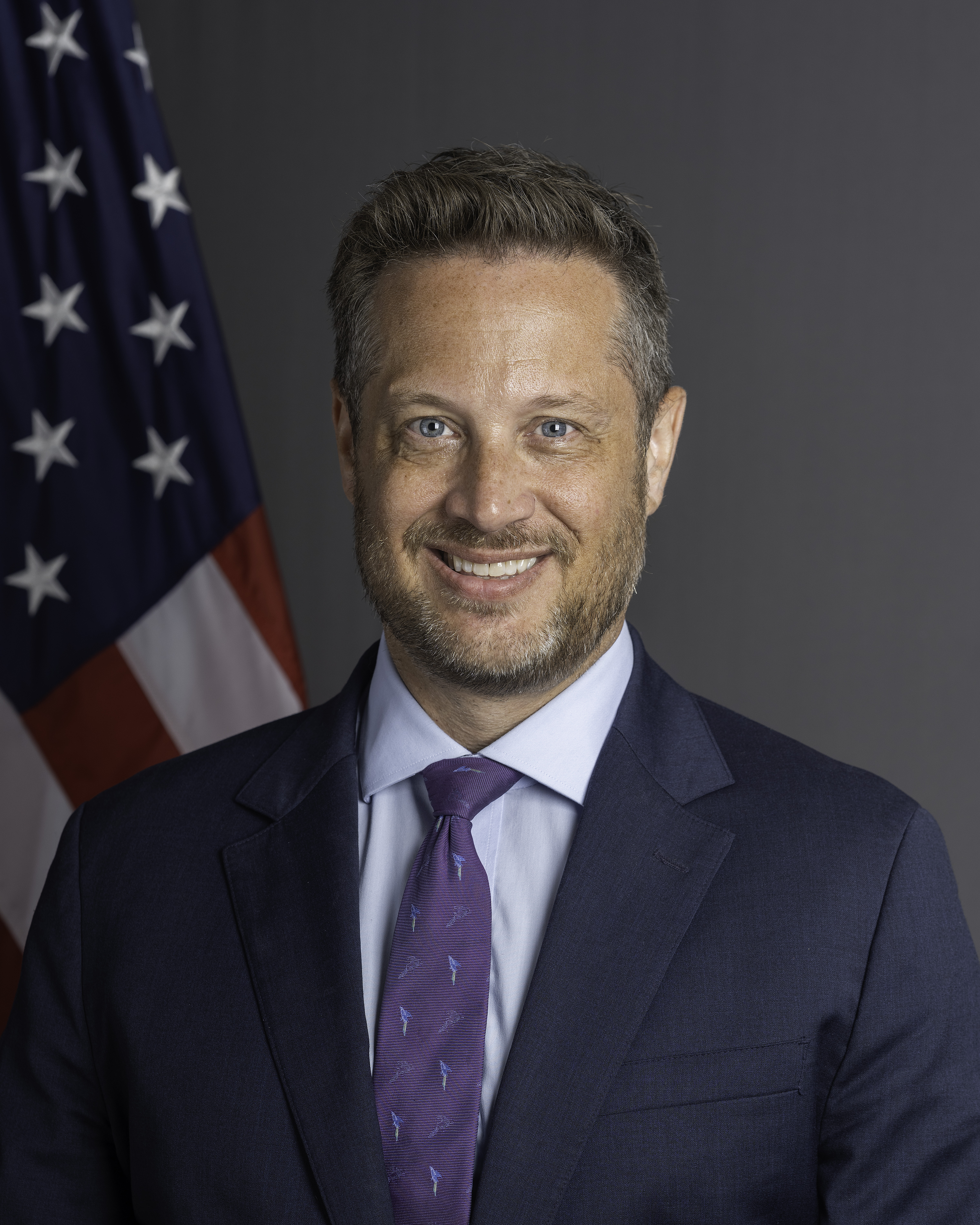

Director of the Office of Foreign Missions
- Acting
- In office January 20, 2025 – January 26, 2026
- President: Donald Trump
- Preceded by: Rebecca Gonzales
- Succeeded by: Lew Olowski (Acting)
- In office August 6, 2020 – May 31, 2022
- President: Donald Trump; Joe Biden
- Preceded by: Stephen Akard
- Succeeded by: Rebecca Gonzales
- In office January 26, 2017 – September 16, 2019
- President: Donald Trump
- Preceded by: Gentry O. Smith
- Succeeded by: Stephen Akard

Personal details
- Born: Clifton C. Seagroves
- Education: East Carolina University (BA); North Carolina Central University (MPA)

Clifton Calvin "Cliff" Seagroves (born January 29, 1976) is an American diplomat who is serving as the deputy director of the Office of Foreign Missions within the United States Department of State. Seagroves first appointed to serve as acting director on January 26, 2017, succeeded Gentry O. Smith.

== Education ==
Seagroves earned a Bachelor of Arts degree in communication from East Carolina University and a Master of Public Administration from North Carolina Central University.

== Career ==
From 1999 to 2002, he worked as a revenue officer in the North Carolina Department of Revenue. He then joined the United States Foreign Service, assigned to the U.S. Embassy in Budapest as an intern. In 2002, Seagroves joined the Office of Foreign Missions, where he specialized in diplomatic and consular missions in the United States. Seagroves later served as the principal deputy director of the office until August 6, 2020. Seagroves was then appointed to serve as acting director after the resignation of Stephen Akard.
