= Steve Linick =

American attorney and politician (born 1963)

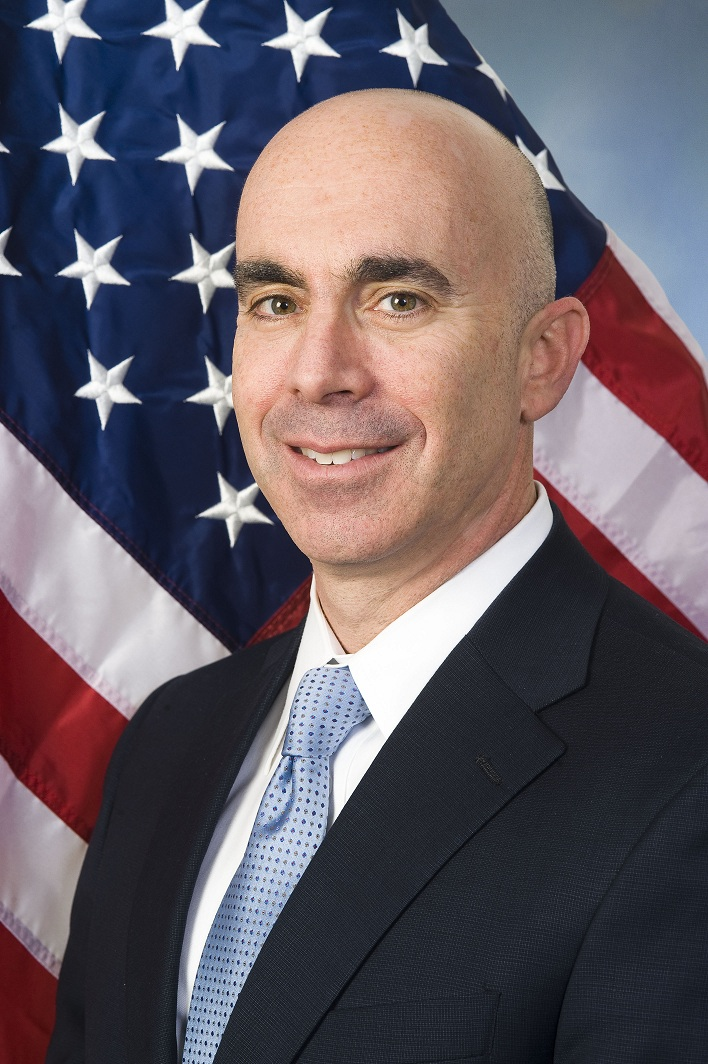

16th Inspector General of the Department of State
- In office September 30, 2013 – June 14, 2020; On leave: May 15, 2020 – June 14, 2020
- President: Barack Obama; Donald Trump
- Preceded by: Howard Krongard (2008)
- Succeeded by: Cardell Richardson (2024)

Inspector General of the Federal Housing Finance Agency
- In office September 29, 2010 – September 30, 2013
- President: Barack Obama
- Preceded by: Position established
- Succeeded by: Michael Stephens (acting)

Personal details
- Born: Steven Alan Linick; 1963 (age 62–63)
- Education: Georgetown University (BA, MA, JD)

Steven Alan Linick (/ˈlɪnɪk/ LIN-ik; born 1963) is an American attorney and State Department official who served as Inspector General of the Department of State and led the Office of the Inspector General of the Department of State. In 2013, he was nominated by President Barack Obama and was confirmed by the United States Senate. Linick was removed from office by Donald Trump on May 15, 2020, effective in 30 days per federal law, with Stephen Akard appointed acting inspector general in the interim.

== Early life ==
Linick earned his Bachelor of Arts (1985) and Master of Arts (1990) in Philosophy, and a Juris Doctor (1990) from Georgetown University in Washington, D.C.

== Career ==
Early in his career, Linick served as an Assistant District Attorney in the Philadelphia District Attorney's Office and as an associate at the Newman & Holtzinger law firm in Washington, D.C.

Linick served as an Assistant United States Attorney in California from 1994 to 1999 and Virginia from 1999 to 2006. He also served as Executive Director of the Department of Justice’s National Procurement Fraud Task Force and Deputy Chief of its Fraud Section in the Criminal Division from 2006 to 2010. During his tenure at the Department of Justice, he supervised and participated in white-collar criminal fraud cases involving corruption and contract fraud against the U.S. in Iraq and Afghanistan.

In 2010, Linick was appointed Inspector General (IG) of the Federal Housing Finance Agency. In that capacity, he led audits and investigations to curb inefficiency and abuses within FHFA, Fannie Mae, and Freddie Mac. In March 2011, Linick published a report criticizing FHFA for authorizing tax-payer funded salaries of $35.4 million to the top six executives at Fannie Mae and Freddie Mac. In October 2011, Linick published the results of an investigation into Fannie Mae and Freddie Mac which found that the regulator for the two companies had failed to create adequate risk controls to help prevent foreclosure abuses.

=== State Department Inspector General ===
In 2013, Linick left FHFA to begin his appointment as Inspector General of the Department of State on September 30, 2013. As IG, his primary function was to audit and investigate possible instances of corruption, abuse, or mismanagement within the State Department.

Early in his tenure, Linick conducted inspections which turned up numerous security deficiencies in five newly-opened overseas State Department facilities, all of which were in locations which were considered to have a high risk of terrorism or sociopolitical unrest; the report became public in 2014. In an August 2015 article in Foreign Policy, writer John Hudson said Linick “surprised observers inside and outside Foggy Bottom with his willingness to publicly criticize the State Department” over matters such as security lapses in overseas compounds exposed by the 2012 Benghazi attack as well as the mishandling of billions in reconstruction funding in Afghanistan and Iraq.

In April 2015, Linick started a review of the “use of personal communications hardware and software by five recent Secretaries of State and their immediate staffs.” Secretary of State John Kerry requested Linick also examine how the State Department meets its "preservation and transparency obligations”. As part of the review, Linick examined Hillary Clinton's use of private email services for correspondence during her tenure as Secretary of State. In his May 2016 report about these practices across various administrations, Linick found Clinton had failed to comply with State Department policies concerning preserving federal records (including emails) and had never sought permission to use a private email system while Secretary of State; Linick also criticized former Secretary of State Colin Powell for failing to appropriately keep records by using private email, but noted that the rules surrounding emails were not as strict during his tenure.

In the spring of 2019, the White House gave Mike Pompeo a group of documents related to the impeachment investigation of Trump. The documents, which at a later date Rudy Giuliani said originated with him, were passed to Linick, who sent them to the FBI. After he obtained FBI clearance, Linick forwarded them in October 2019 to Congress during the impeachment investigation of President Trump over the Trump–Ukraine scandal. Linick’s action put him at odds with State Department leadership, which had decided not to cooperate with Congressional impeachment investigations.

Beginning in 2018, Linick oversaw a State Department investigation concerning discrimination or retaliation against civil servants within the State Department by Trump administration political appointees. The findings of this investigation were detailed in a report, released in November 2019, which found that Trump appointees violated State Department policies directing placement of career State Department staff members on a meritocratic basis and instead engaged in harassment of certain staffers because of their ethnic background or political affiliation.

=== Firing ===
On May 15, 2020, Linick was informed by Brian Bulatao and Stephen Biegun, two of Secretary of State Mike Pompeo’s high-ranking aides, that President Trump had decided to remove him from his post; Linick was then immediately placed on administrative leave. His dismissal was officially announced in a letter sent by Trump to House Speaker Nancy Pelosi late that same night. In that letter, Trump said that the firing was necessary because he had lost confidence in Linick, however Pompeo later said that it was his decision to remove Linick.

Congress held hearings to determine if Linick's firing was in retaliation for conducting investigations related to Secretary Pompeo and other officials. In a June 2020 Congressional hearing, Linick testified about the circumstances leading to his firing, including an investigation into whether Pompeo and his wife used government staff for private errands, and alleged “bullying” by Pompeo aide Brian Bulatao to try to stop an investigation into emergency arms sales to Saudi Arabia and the United Arab Emirates despite congressional objections.

Linick had been probing Trump's controversial bypassing of Congress to sell weapons to Saudi Arabia. Linick had also been conducting—as he testified to Congress on June 3, 2020, which was released in a transcript a week later—five investigations into the State Department, including a watchdog investigation into Secretary Mike Pompeo's alleged use of a political appointee as a domestic personal assistant.

In April 2021, the State Department Inspector General’s Office released the final report on the internal investigation begun by Linick concerning Pompeo’s improper use of State Department employees as Secretary of State. The report found that more than a hundred improper requests were made by either Pompeo or his wife, including asking aides to mail out personal holiday cards, care for family pets, or plan personal events not related to State Department activities.

When he was dismissed, Linick was also investigating a potential pattern of racist and sexist behavior by Woody Johnson, the ambassador to the United Kingdom, as well as the possibility that Johnson had used his position as ambassador to advance President Trump’s personal business interests. A report released by the IG’s office in August 2020 found that Johnson had made “inappropriate or insensitive comments” to Embassy staff in London, but the allegations that Johnson had attempted to further Trump’s private business interests as ambassador were not investigated further.
