= Rebecca E. Gonzales =

American diplomat (born 1963)

Rebecca Gonzales
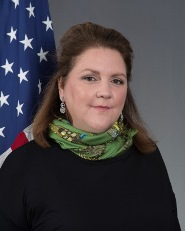

Director of the Office of Foreign Missions
- In office May 31, 2022 – January 20, 2025
- President: Joe Biden
- Preceded by: Stephen Akard
- Succeeded by: Cliff Seagroves (acting)

United States Ambassador to Lesotho
- In office February 8, 2018 – February 4, 2022
- President: Donald Trump; Joe Biden
- Preceded by: Matthew T. Harrington
- Succeeded by: Maria Brewer

Personal details
- Born: May 19, 1963 (age 63) Sumter, South Carolina, U.S.
- Education: George Washington University (BA, MBA); National Defense University (MS)

Rebecca Eliza Gonzales (born May 19, 1963) is an American diplomat who had served as the director of the Office of Foreign Missions. She served as the United States ambassador to Lesotho from 2018 to 2022.

== Early life and education ==
Gonzales was born on May 19, 1963, in Sumter, South Carolina. She earned a Bachelor of Arts and a Master of Business Administration from the George Washington University and a Master of Science from the Dwight D. Eisenhower School for National Security and Resource Strategy at Fort Lesley J. McNair.

== Foreign service career ==
Gonzales is a career member of the Senior Foreign Service; she has been a diplomat since 1992. Gonzales has served diplomatic assignments in Panama City, Athens, Bogotá, New Delhi, Riyadh, Gaborone, and Pretoria. She previously served as chief of staff of the Bureau of Administration at the United States Department of State.

=== Ambassador to Lesotho ===
On September 7, 2017, President Donald Trump announced Gonzales as the nominee to serve as the United States ambassador to Lesotho. On November 1, 2017, a hearing on her nomination was held before the Senate Foreign Relations Committee, and her nomination was reported out of committee on November 14, 2017. On November 16, 2017, her nomination was confirmed in the Senate by voice vote.

=== Biden administration ===
On August 4, 2021, President Joe Biden announced his intent to nominate Gonzales to serve as the director of the Office of Foreign Missions. On September 13, 2021, her nomination was sent to the Senate. On March 15, 2022, a hearing on her nomination was held before the Senate Foreign Relations Committee and she was reported out of committee on March 23. On May 19, 2022, her nomination was confirmed in the Senate by voice vote. She assumed office on May 31, 2022.

== Personal life ==
Gonzales speaks Spanish and Greek.

Diplomatic posts
Preceded by Matthew T. Harrington	United States Ambassador to Lesotho; 2018–2022	Succeeded by Maria Brewer
Preceded by Cliff Seagroves; Acting	Director of the Office of Foreign Missions; 2022–2025	Succeeded by Cliff Seagroves; Acting
