= Robert Geers Loftis =

American diplomat

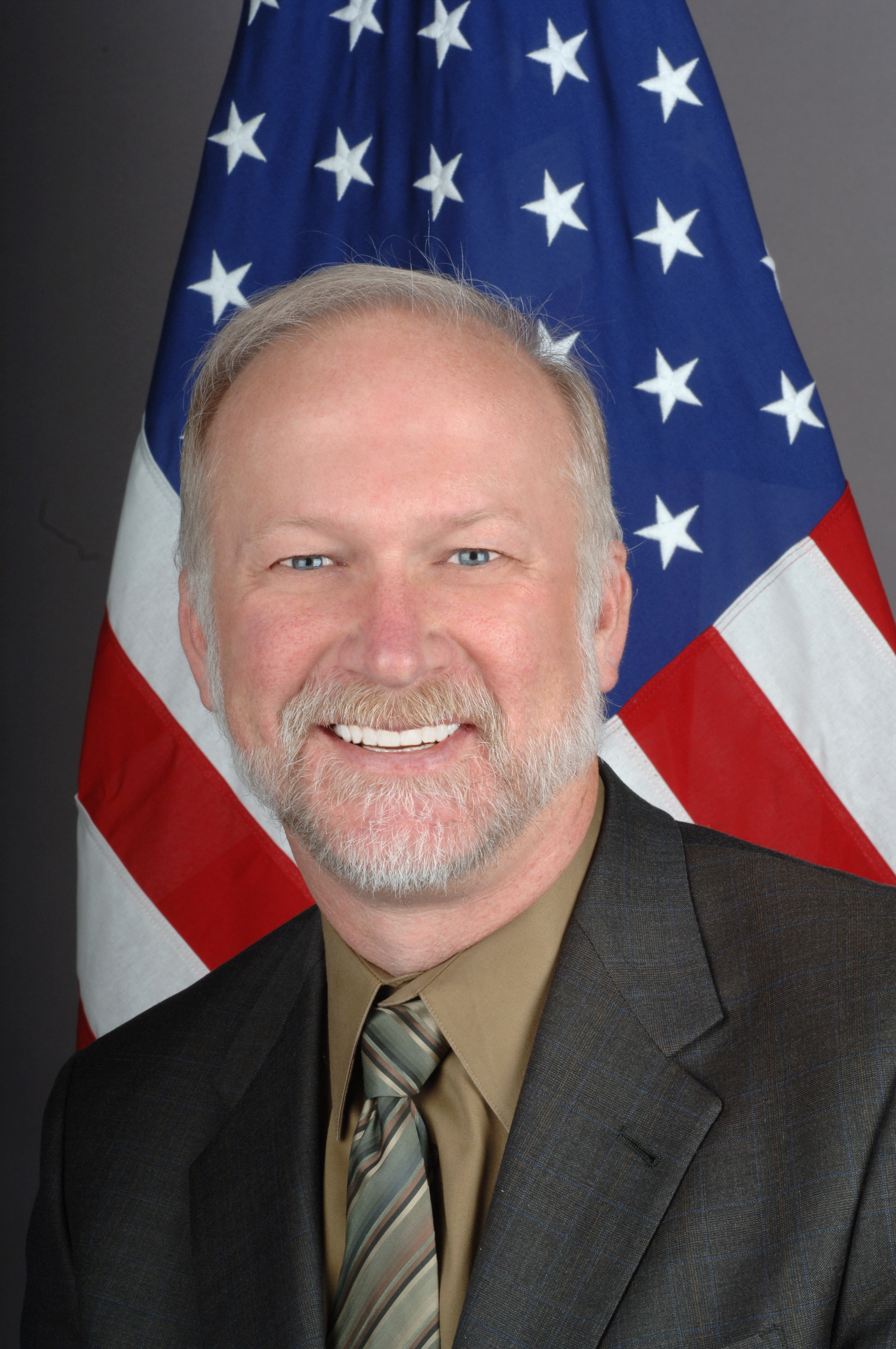
Robert Geers Loftis

Robert Geers Loftis (born 1956) is a career member of the United States Foreign Service, former United States Ambassador to the Kingdom of Lesotho, and former Acting Coordinator for Reconstruction and Stabilization at the United States Department of State.

In 2013, Loftis joined Boston University as a professor of international relations.

== Career ==
Loftis is the Acting Coordinator for Reconstruction and Stabilization, leading the development of the U.S. government civilian capacity to promote conflict prevention, peacebuilding and stabilization efforts in countries on the brink of, in, or emerging from crisis. The Coordinator is responsible for overseeing the Civilian Response Corps, with Active and Standby components spanning eight federal government agencies. The Corps is the U.S. civilian surge capability for conflict prevention and stabilization operations overseas.

Loftis' previous position as a member of the Foreign Service was as the State Department's Special Representative for Avian and Pandemic Influenza from March 2009 to August 2010. At this post, Loftis led the Department of State's efforts to prevent avian influenza virus.

Loftis was the Deputy Commandant and Senior Advisor for International Affairs of the Industrial College of the Armed Forces at National Defense University, where he also taught strategic leadership.

Loftis was the Senior Advisor for Security Negotiations and Agreements in the Bureau of Political-Military Affairs in the Department of State from August 2004 to July 2007. His primary responsibilities were to negotiate status of forces and base access agreements for the deployment of United States forces abroad, as well to negotiate burden-sharing agreements with allies and partners. In early 2008, he led the initial negotiations for a status of forces agreement with Iraq. He was also the Deputy Executive Director of the Implementation Planning Team for the creation of the United States Africa Command (AFRICOM).

In June 2006, Loftis and Foreign Minister Alikbek Jekshenkulov led a delegation to negotiate the terms of a U.S. military air base in Kyrgyzstan. Loftis took part in a round of talks to ensure U.S. interests in the Manas Air Base, a base that has strategic value due to the closure of the Khanabad air base in neighboring Uzbekistan which was forced to vacate in 2005. The negotiations were a result of the Kyrgyz President Kurmanbek Bakiev, who requested further monetary compensation for land rights. The request by the Kyrgyz president was made in February 2006 for the sum of $207 million a year.

Loftis negotiated renewable ten year agreements for U.S. military bases in Romania and Bulgaria which were signed in 2005 and early 2006. The negotiations and agreements were between Romania, Bulgaria and America. The negotiations concluded in troop allotments of up to 2,500 troops at any one time with a maximum of 5,000 troops allowable at both bases for a 90-day period.

From September 2001 to July 2004, Loftis was United States Ambassador to Lesotho, where he focused on the promotion of democratic institutions, economic and trade development, and the fight against HIV/AIDS. His work on the May 2002 Lesotho general election encouraged democratic trends in southern Africa, developed a South African led voting system and established precedent for a fair election. The election was a first since the last national election in 1998 caused rioting and claims of vote rigging.

Previous overseas assignments include Deputy Chief of Mission in Maputo, Mozambique, Political Counselor at the U.S. Mission to the United Nations in Geneva, Switzerland, Political Officer at the U.S. Embassy in Wellington, New Zealand, Political/Economic Officer in Brasília, Brazil, and General Services Officer in Bissau, Guinea-Bissau. Domestic assignments included deputy director of the Office of Peacekeeping and Humanitarian Operations, Action Officer in the Office of Strategic and Theater Policy, Country Officer for Burma and staff assistant in the Bureau of Inter-American Affairs. Loftis joined the Foreign Service in May 1980. He speaks Portuguese and French and has received several State Department Superior and Meritorious Honor Awards, as well as the Chairman of the Joint Chiefs of Staff Joint Meritorious Civilian Service Award. He earned his B.A. in political science with distinction and honors from Colorado State University.

Diplomatic posts
Preceded by Katherine Canavan	United States Ambassador to Lesotho; 2001–2004	Succeeded by June Carter Perry
