= Bismarck Myrick =

American diplomat (1940–2024)

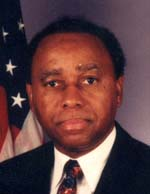

United States Ambassador to Liberia
- In office August 20, 1999 – July 23, 2002
- President: Bill Clinton; George W. Bush
- Preceded by: William Milam
- Succeeded by: John W. Blaney

United States Ambassador to Lesotho
- In office April 27, 1995 – June 10, 1998
- President: Bill Clinton
- Preceded by: Karl W. Hofmann
- Succeeded by: Katherine Canavan

Personal details
- Born: December 23, 1940 Portsmouth, Virginia, U.S.
- Died: September 29, 2024 (aged 83)
- Spouse: Marie-Pierre Mbaye-Myrick
- Education: University of Tampa; Syracuse University

Bismarck Myrick Sr. (December 23, 1940 – September 29, 2024) was an American diplomat who was U.S. Ambassador to the Republic of Liberia (1999–2002) and Lesotho (1995–1998). He was a career member of the Senior Foreign Service and a decorated Vietnam War hero. He represented the U.S. at the swearing in of South Africa's first democratic parliament, led by Nelson Mandela. The Kingdom of Lesotho conferred on him the Kingdom's highest honor to a non-citizen. Liberia's major newspapers and civil society organizations named him "Diplomat of the Year" or "Man of the Year" for three consecutive years. The Portsmouth, Virginia City Council appointed him Goodwill Ambassador for Goree Island, Senegal in 2008. Portsmouth named two streets in his honor in 2001 and selected him as a 2006 "Portsmouth Notable" – the city's highest honor. He is featured in the March, 2013 edition of "The Citizen of Chesapeake" Newspaper. Active in community service, he was on a number of boards, such as the World Affairs Council.

== Career ==
A native of Portsmouth, Virginia, Myrick earned a bachelor's degree from the University of Tampa and a master's degree from Syracuse University. Spelman College in Atlanta awarded him a Doctor of Humane Letters degree.

=== Military ===
Myrick began his military career as an army private. He performed military police duties in Okinawa and Germany before his first assignment as an infantry officer in South Korea. He was an infantry company commander in Vietnam from 1968 to 1969. He earned the Silver Star, two Bronze Stars for heroism in combat, two Bronze Stars for meritorious service in a combat zone, the Purple Heart, Meritorious Service Medal, Parachutist Badge, and Combat Infantryman Badge. He was inducted into the U.S. Army Hall of Fame at Fort Benning, Georgia in 1996. An Army Foreign Area Officer (Africa Specialist), he was Director of African Studies at the School of International Studies, Fort Bragg, North Carolina. He is in the National Infantry Museum's Hall of Fame at Fort Benning, Georgia. He was the ODU 2011 Veterans Day Honoree and Featured Speaker.

=== Foreign Service ===
Myrick joined the Foreign Service in 1980 and was assigned as Desk Officer for Somalia in the Office of East African Affairs. From 1982 to 1984, he served as Political Officer at Monrovia in Liberia. He returned to Washington, D.C. to serve from 1985 to 1987 as Action Officer in the Office of Strategic Nuclear Policy, Bureau of Politico-Military Affairs. He was Chairman (1986–87) of the Interagency Nuclear Testing Arms Control Working Group and served on the U.S. Delegation to the Geneva Nuclear Testing talks. Myrick served as Deputy Director for policy planning and coordination in the Bureau of Inter-American Affairs from 1987 to 1989. In 1989, he was awarded a Una Chapman Cox Fellowship and conducted research on a project entitled "Change in the Horn of Africa and Implications for U.S. Foreign Policy in the 1990s." He held the Department of State's Superior Honor Award and four Meritorious Honor Awards.

While serving as the ambassador to Liberia, Myrick became the center of a potential international incident, as after alleging that Myrick had interfered in domestic political issues, ruling National Patriotic Party chairman Cyril Allen urged the government to arrest Myrick. Disputes erupted among NPP partisans, as some opposed the statement of their party boss and called for an increased separation between their party and the government.

The government of Lesotho awarded him the Most Meritorious Order of Mohlomi, its highest honor to a non-citizen, for his work in promoting democracy. He also served as Principal Officer in Cape Town, South Africa from 1993 to 1995, and as Principal Officer in Durban, South Africa from 1990 to 1993, where he helped manage U.S. policies during that nation's transformation from apartheid to non-racial democracy. During his military career, Myrick also served in Ethiopia from 1975 to 1979 as an Army foreign area officer.

Myrick was co-author of Three Aspects of Crisis in Colonial Kenya; author of "The United States and Liberia" in The African Experience: Past, Present, and Future and author of scores of official documents.

=== Old Dominion University ===
Myrick later taught political science at Old Dominion University as an Ambassador-in-Residence and Lecturer.

== Death ==
Myrick died on September 29, 2024, at the age of 83.

Diplomatic posts
Preceded by office reestablished	United States Ambassador to Lesotho; 1995–1998	Succeeded by Katherine Canavan
Preceded by office reestablished	United States Ambassador to Liberia; 1999–2002	Succeeded by John William Blaney
