= List of ambassadors of the United States to Lesotho =

Ambassador of the United States to Lesotho
- Seal of the United States Department of State

- Flag of a United States ambassador

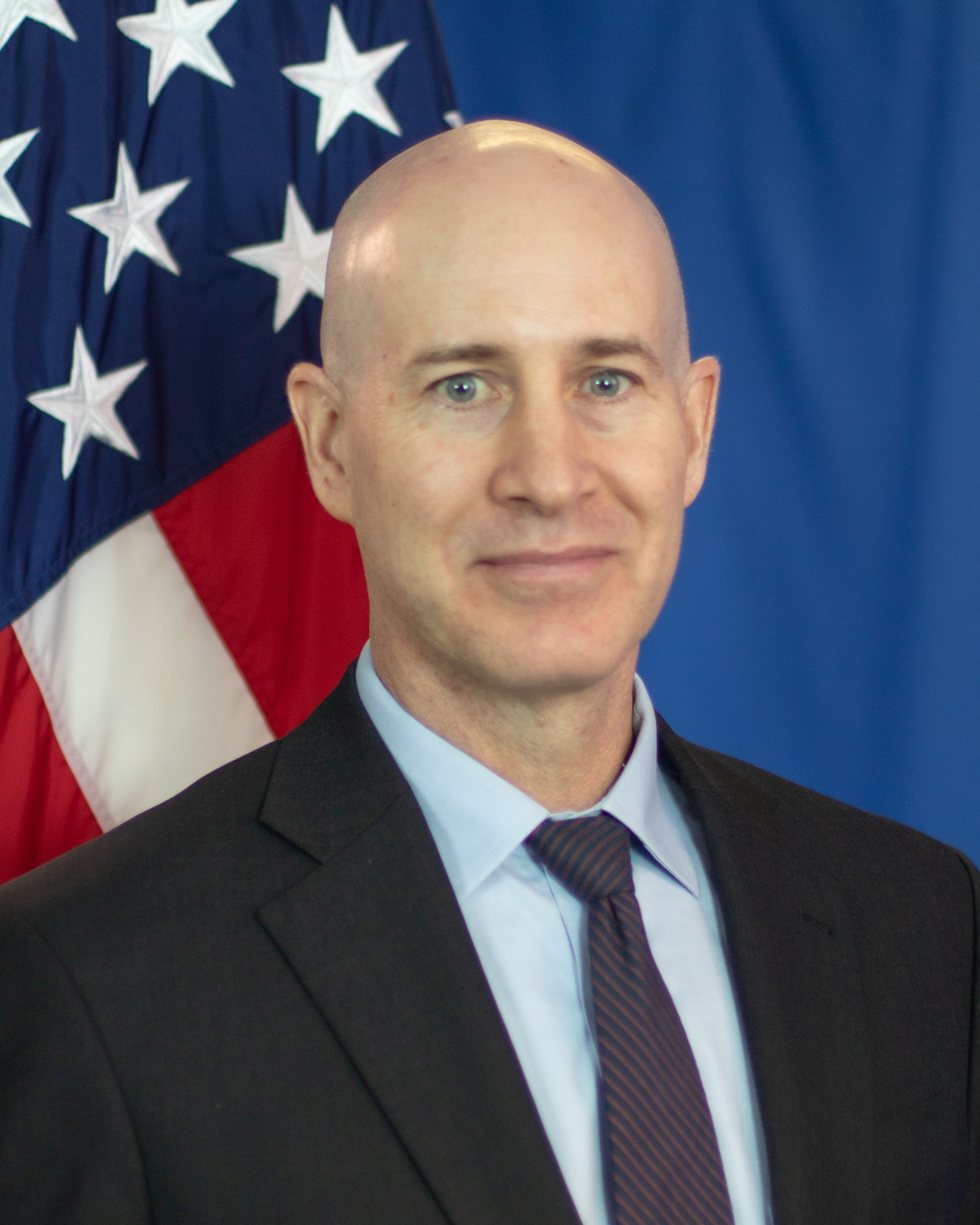
- Incumbent; Thomas Hines; Chargé d'affaires ad interim since August 13, 2024
- Nominator: The president of the United States
- Appointer: The president with Senate advice and consent
- Inaugural holder: Richard St. F. Post as Chargé d'affaires ad interim
- Formation: October 4, 1966
- Website: ls.usembassy.gov

Prior to 1965, the area of southern Africa that is now Lesotho was a Crown colony by the name of Basutoland. Along with most of the empire's other colonies and protectorates, Basutoland gained full independence from Britain in the 1960s. The nation was granted full autonomy on April 30, 1965. On October 4, 1966, Basutoland was granted independence, governed by a constitutional monarchy with a bicameral parliament. At the same time the name of the country was changed to The Kingdom of Lesotho.

The United States immediately recognized Lesotho after the nation gained its independence. An embassy in Maseru was established on October 4, 1966, Lesotho's independence day. Richard St. F. Post was appointed chargé d'affaires ad interim pending the arrival of an ambassador. The first ambassador, Charles J. Nelson was appointed on June 9, 1971. Until 1979 one ambassador was accredited to Lesotho, Swaziland, and Botswana. The ambassador was resident in Gaborone, Botswana.

== Ambassadors ==
- Note: Pending appointment of the first ambassador, the following officers served as chargé d'affaires ad interim: Richard St. F. Post (October 1966–July 1968), Norman E. Barth (July 1968–August 1969), and Stephen G. Gebelt (October 1969–December 1970).

Name	Title	Appointed	Presented credentials	Terminated mission	Notes
Charles J. Nelson – Career FSO	Ambassador Extraordinary and Plenipotentiary	June 9, 1971	September 23, 1971	Left Gaborone, March 2, 1974	
David B. Bolen – Career FSO	Ambassador Extraordinary and Plenipotentiary	February 28, 1974	April 25, 1974	Left Gaborone, August 11, 1976	
Donald R. Norland – Career FSO	Ambassador Extraordinary and Plenipotentiary	November 17, 1976	January 6, 1977	Left Gaborone, October 6, 1979	Beginning in 1979, the ambassador was accredited solely to Lesotho and resident in Maseru.
John R. Clingerman – Career FSO	Ambassador Extraordinary and Plenipotentiary	September 28, 1979	November 1, 1979	November 15, 1981	
Keith Lapham Brown – Political appointee	Ambassador Extraordinary and Plenipotentiary	March 9, 1982	March 25, 1982	December 1, 1983	
Shirley Abbott – Political appointee	Ambassador Extraordinary and Plenipotentiary	May 11, 1984	July 3, 1984	August 18, 1986	
Robert M. Smalley – Political appointee	Ambassador Extraordinary and Plenipotentiary	June 15, 1987	July 2, 1987	July 7, 1989	
Leonard H. O. Spearman – Political appointee	Ambassador Extraordinary and Plenipotentiary	October 22, 1990	January 24, 1991	April 25, 1993	Karl Hoffmann served as chargé d'affaires ad interim, April 1993–April 1995.
Bismarck Myrick – Career FSO	Ambassador Extraordinary and Plenipotentiary	March 4, 1995	April 27, 1995	June 10, 1998	
Katherine Canavan – Career FSO	Ambassador Extraordinary and Plenipotentiary	June 29, 1998	September 18, 1998	June 1, 2001	
Robert Geers Loftis – Career FSO	Ambassador Extraordinary and Plenipotentiary	August 6, 2001	October 11, 2001	June 18, 2004	
June Carter Perry – Career FSO	Ambassador Extraordinary and Plenipotentiary	July 2, 2004	September 23, 2004	May 21, 2007	
Robert B. Nolan – Career FSO	Ambassador Extraordinary and Plenipotentiary	September 26, 2007	October 10, 2007	September 3, 2010	
Michele T. Bond – Career FSO	Ambassador Extraordinary and Plenipotentiary	September 14, 2010	October 28, 2010	December 4, 2012	
Matthew T. Harrington – Career FSO	Ambassador Extraordinary and Plenipotentiary	September 22, 2014	October 18, 2014	January 20, 2017	
Rebecca Gonzales – Career FSO	Ambassador Extraordinary and Plenipotentiary	November 16, 2017	February 8, 2018	February 4, 2022	
Maria E. Brewer – Career FSO	Ambassador Extraordinary and Plenipotentiary	December 18, 2021	March 10, 2022	April 12, 2024	
Keisha Toms Boutaleb – Career FSO	Chargé d'affaires ad interim	April 12, 2024		August 13, 2024	
Thomas Hines – Career FSO	Chargé d'affaires ad interim	August 13, 2024		Incumbent	

== See also ==
- Lesotho–United States relations
- Foreign relations of Lesotho
- Ambassadors of the United States
