= Michael Canavan (general) =

United States Army general (1946–2026)

Michael A. Canavan
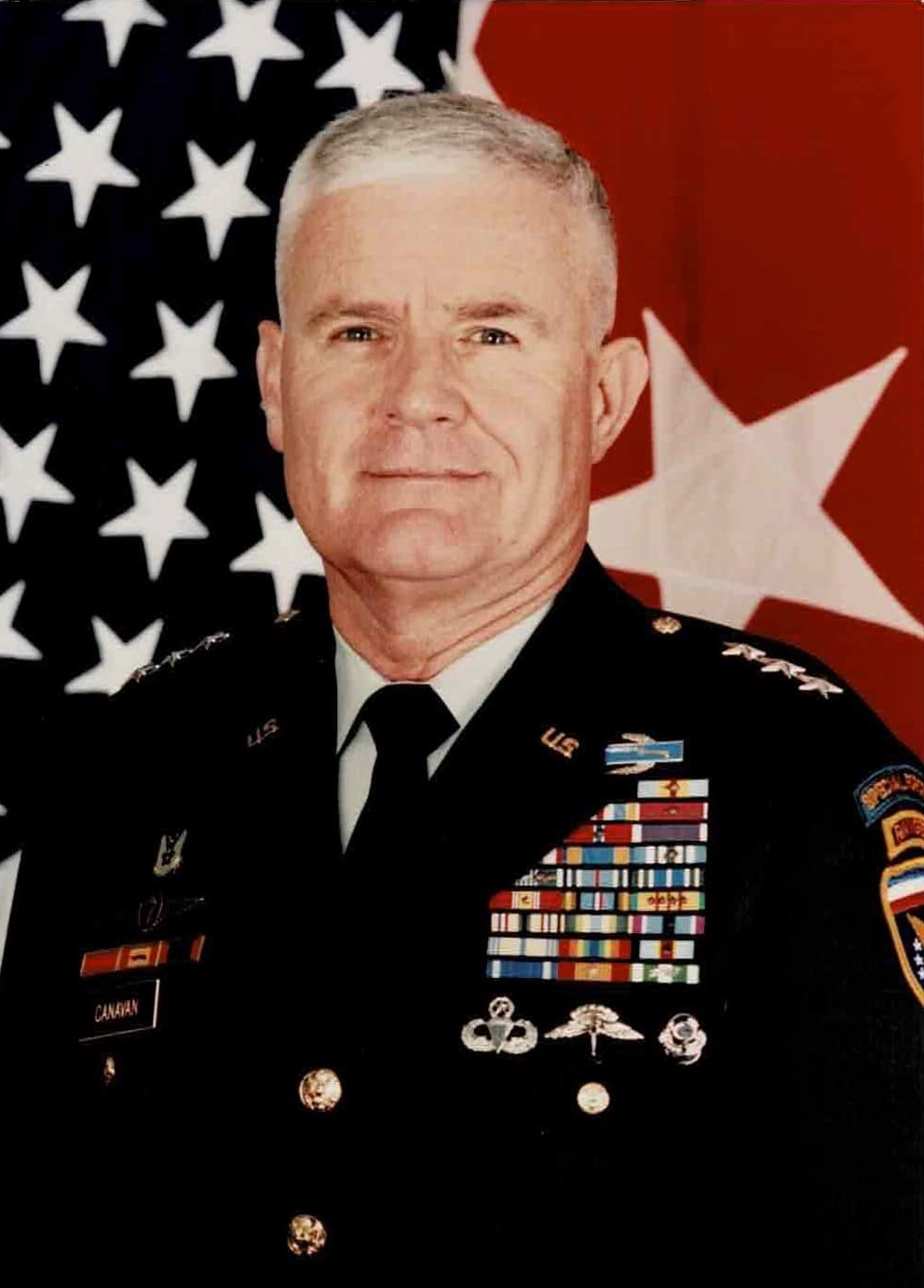
- Born: December 5, 1946; Quincy, Massachusetts, U.S.
- Died: February 13, 2026 (aged 79); St. Helena Island, South Carolina, U.S.
- Military career
- Allegiance: United States
- Branch: United States Army
- Service years: 1966–2001
- Rank: Lieutenant General
- Commands: Joint Special Operations Command; Special Operations Command, Europe; TRADOC Analysis Command; 1st Battalion (A-401), 5th Special Forces Group
- Conflicts: Vietnam War
- Awards: Defense Distinguished Service Medal (2); Defense Superior Service Medal; Legion of Merit (2); Bronze Star Medal (2); Purple Heart

Michael A. Canavan (December 5, 1946 – February 13, 2026) was a United States Army lieutenant general and former Federal Aviation Administration security official.

Canavan sat on the board of defense contractor USfalcon.

He commanded Special Operations Command Europe and the Joint Special Operations Command, and retired after serving as the chief of staff for the United States European Command. On the morning of the September 11 attacks, he was in Puerto Rico and had failed to designate a replacement. In the wake of the attacks, Canavan resigned his position as Associate Administrator for Civil Aviation Security at the FAA amid controversy over Air Marshal assignments to Bush administration Cabinet members and confidence in his leadership.

As a major general Canavan led the team in Croatia that recovered and identified the bodies from the 1996 crash of an Air Force CT-43, which killed the Commerce Secretary, Ronald H. Brown.

Michael Canavan (right) with his wife, Ambassador Katherine Canavan (center) at Patch Barracks in January 2011.

Canavan was married to Ambassador Katherine Canavan. He died after a long illness at home, on February 13, 2026, at the age of 79.
