= Clifford G. Bond =

American diplomat (born 1948)

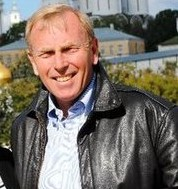
Clifford G. Bond

Clifford George Bond (born February 23, 1948) is a retired American Ambassador to Bosnia and Herzegovina in 2001–2004 and as Special Envoy for Srebrenica in 2007–2008. He was also Chargé d'Affaires, a.i. in Estonia.

Bond earned an undergraduate degree from Georgetown University's School of Foreign Service and a M.Sc. degree in economics from the London School of Economics. He also attended the National War College. He is married to Michele Thoren Bond.
