= Alexander Krongard =

American Navy admiral (born 1962)

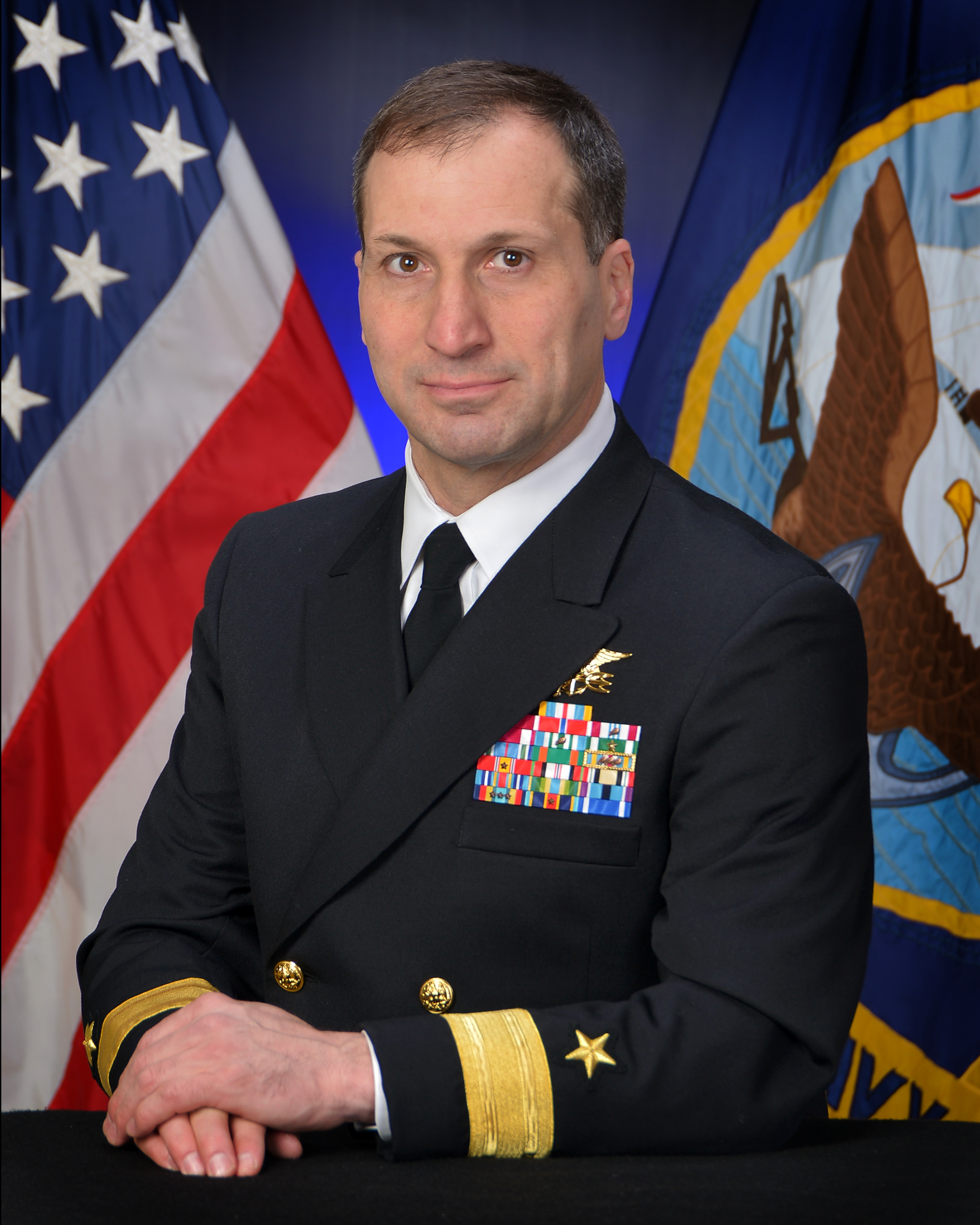
- Born: Alexander Lion Krongard; December 1962 (age 63)
- Military career
- Allegiance: United States
- Branch: United States Navy
- Service years: 1985–2016
- Rank: Rear Admiral
- Nickname: Alex
- Unit: United States Navy SEALs
- Commands: Naval Special Warfare Development Group; SEAL TEAM SEVEN; Naval Special Warfare Group ONE
- Conflicts: War in Afghanistan; Iraq War
- Awards: Defense Superior Service Medal; Legion of Merit; Bronze Star Medal

Alexander L. Krongard (born December 1962) is a retired United States Navy SEAL. He retired from the United States Navy as a rear admiral in 2016 after 31 years of military service. He served as the deputy commander of United States Africa Command and previously commanded Naval Special Warfare Group ONE.

== Early life and education ==
Krongard is the son of A.B. Krongard and Patricia A. Lion and was raised in Baltimore, Maryland. His father was chief executive officer and chairman of the Board of Alex. Brown & Sons, the nation's oldest investment banking firm, before serving as counselor to the Director of Central Intelligence George Tenet. Krongard graduated from the Princeton University with a bachelor's degree in English in 1985 before joining the United States Navy.

== Naval career ==
Krongard entered active duty with the United States Navy completing Officer Candidate School in Newport, Rhode Island in 1985. After his commission as an ensign in the U.S. Navy, he received orders to Basic Underwater Demolition/SEAL training (BUD/S) at Naval Amphibious Base Coronado. He graduated BUD/S class 138 in June 1986. Following SEAL Tactical Training (STT) and completion of six month probationary period, he received the 1130 designator as a Naval Special Warfare Officer, entitled to wear the Special Warfare insignia also known as "SEAL Trident". As a Navy SEAL officer Krongard served as platoon commander in SEAL TEAM ONE from 1986 to 1990. Krongard then completed selection and training for assignment to Naval Special Warfare Development Group in 1990 where he served as element leader till 1993. Krongard completed language training in German at the Defense Language Institute in Monterey, California and transferred to Naval Special Warfare Unit TWO initially located in Machrihanish, Scotland but later moved to Stuttgart, Germany. Krongard later earned a Master of Arts degree from the National War College. Krongard served staff and command tours including operations officer Special Operations Command Europe (SOCEUR); executive officer at SEAL Team TWO; staff officer, Joint Special Operations Command from 1999 to 2001; commanding officer at SEAL Team SEVEN from 2002 to 2004; deputy commander, Combined Joint Task Force-Horn of Africa at Camp Lemonnier and executive assistant to the deputy chief of naval operations for information, plans and strategy; counterterrorism director, National Security Council staff in Washington, D.C.

As a Navy captain, Krongard assumed command of Naval Special Warfare Group ONE (NSWG1) from August 2009 to July 2011 responsible for preparing West Coast-based SEAL Teams 1, 3, 5, 7 for their operational deployments overseas. Krongard then received assignment as chief of staff at Special Operations Command Central. After promotion to rear admiral, Krongard served as deputy director for operations, United States Africa Command. Krongard retired from active duty in September 2016.

This article contains material from the United States Federal Government and is in the public domain.

== Awards and decorations ==
U.S. military decorations
Defense Superior Service Medal
Legion of Merit
Bronze Star
Defense Meritorious Service Medal with bronze oak leaf cluster
Meritorious Service Medal
Joint Service Commendation Medal with bronze oak leaf cluster
Navy and Marine Corps Commendation Medal with gold award star
Joint Service Achievement Medal
Navy and Marine Corps Achievement Medal
Joint Meritorious Unit Award with three bronze oak leaf clusters
National Defense Service Medal with bronze service star
Afghanistan Campaign Medal
Iraq Campaign Medal
Global War on Terrorism Service Medal
Armed Forces Service Medal
Humanitarian Service Medal
Navy Sea Service Deployment Ribbon with three bronze service stars
Navy and Marine Corps Overseas Service Ribbon with bronze service star
NATO Medal for Former Yugoslavia

U.S. badges, patches and tabs
Naval Special Warfare insignia
Navy and Marine Corps Parachutist Insignia
