= Maria E. Brewer =

American diplomat

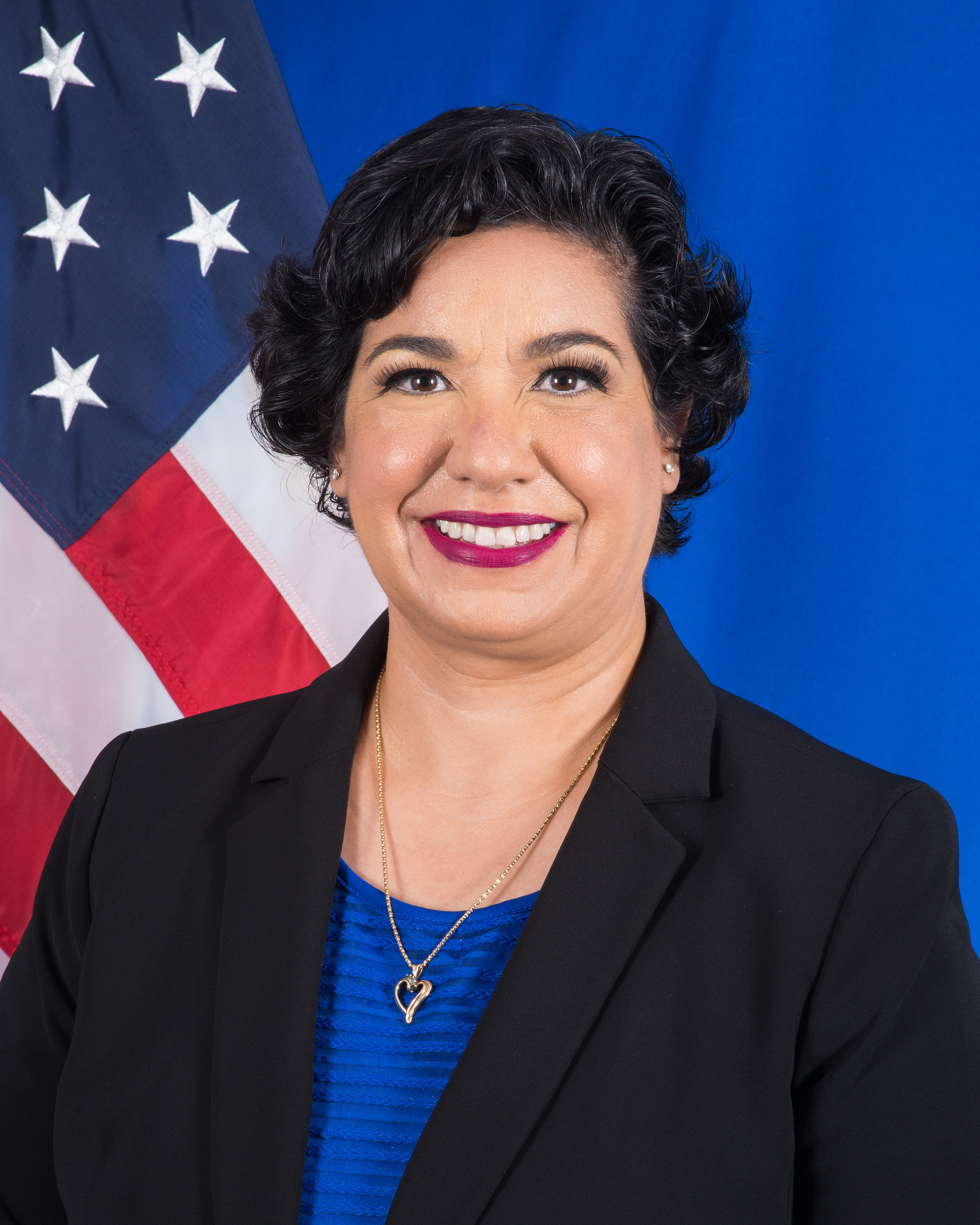

United States Ambassador to Lesotho
- In office March 10, 2022 – April 12, 2024
- President: Joe Biden
- Preceded by: Rebecca Gonzales

United States Ambassador to Sierra Leone
- In office October 5, 2017 – February 22, 2021
- President: Donald Trump; Joe Biden
- Preceded by: John Hoover
- Succeeded by: David Dale Reimer

Personal details
- Education: Valparaiso University; National Defense University

Maria Elena Brewer is an American diplomat who had served as the United States Ambassador to Lesotho from 2022 to 2024. She previously served as the United States Ambassador to Sierra Leone from 2017 to 2021.

== Early life and education ==
Brewer grew up in Northwest Indiana. She graduated from Valparaiso University with a Bachelor of Arts in international economics and cultural affairs in 1995. She also has a Master of Science from National Defense University.

== Career ==
Brewer has been a career Foreign Service Officer for the United States since 1996. She has held posts in Lagos, Nigeria; Freetown, Sierra Leone; Mumbai, India; Islamabad, Pakistan; and Colombo, Sri Lanka. She held several senior leadership positions with the United States Department of State, including serving as Deputy Director of the Career Development and Assignments Division of the Bureau of Human Resources.

=== Ambassador to Sierra Leone ===
On July 13, 2017, President Donald Trump nominated Brewer to be the next United States Ambassador to Sierra Leone. Hearings were held on her nomination in the Senate Foreign Relations Committee on July 26, 2017. On August 3, 2017, the committee favorably reported her nomination to the Senate floor. Brewer was confirmed by the United States Senate by voice vote the same day. She left her post in February 2021.

=== Ambassador to Lesotho ===
On April 15, 2021, President Joe Biden nominated Brewer to be the next United States Ambassador to Lesotho. The Senate Foreign Relations Committee held hearings on her nomination on June 9, 2021. The committee reported her favorably to the Senate floor on June 24, 2021. On December 18, 2021, the entire United States Senate confirmed her nomination by voice vote. On March 10, 2022, she presented her credentials to King Letsie III.

=== Foreign Service Institute ===
On May 13, 2024, Brewer assumed the role as the deputy director of the Foreign Service Institute. She had served acting director of the Foreign Service Institute from March 3 to July 14, 2025.

== Personal life ==
Brewer speaks Spanish, Krio and Hindi.

Diplomatic posts
Preceded by John Hoover	United States Ambassador to Sierra Leone; 2017–2021	Succeeded by David Dale Reimer
Preceded by Rebecca Gonzales	United States Ambassador to Lesotho; 2022–2024	Vacant
