= Matthew T. Harrington =

American diplomat (born 1966)

United States Ambassador to Lesotho
- In office October 18, 2014 – January 20, 2017
- President: Barack Obama
- Preceded by: Michele Thoren Bond
- Succeeded by: Rebecca E. Gonzales

Personal details
- Born: 1966 (age 59–60)
- Children: 2
- Education: Lee University (BA)
- Profession: Diplomat

Matthew T. Harrington (born in 1966) is an American diplomat who is a career member of the Senior Foreign Service and a former United States Ambassador to Lesotho.

== Background and education ==
Harrington was born in 1966. Harrington earned a Bachelor of Arts in History from Lee University, Washington.

== Personal life ==
He has two children.

== Career ==
Harrington started his career in 1988 as a Peace Corps member in Zouerate, Mauritania and later served as a Program Associate with the American Association of State Colleges and Universities in 1990. Harrington joined the Foreign Service in 1991 and he occupied various positions. He was appointed as the Consular Officer at the United States embassy in Accra, Ghana. In 1995, he served as the political officer in the United States Embassy in Brasilia, Brazil. Thereafter, Harrington worked as the Watch Officer in the Operation's Center in Washington and also worked with the Bureau of African Affairs as the Sudan Desk Officer in 1998. In 2000, Harrington was appointed to serve at the United States Embassy in Zimbabwe as the Political Officer. Subsequently, he served as the Assistant to the Chief of Mission at the United States Embassy in Togo and also in Namibia. He occupied the position of the Foreign Policy Advisor to the General Commanding the United States Army in San Antonio, Texas.

From 2014 to 2017, he was the Ambassador of the United States to Lesotho appointed by the United States Senate.
