= Katherine Canavan =

American diplomat

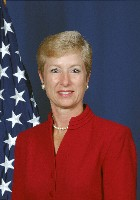
Katherine Canavan

Katherine Hubay Smith Peterson Canavan (born 1949) served as a United States diplomat and career foreign service officer for 35 years. She retired in November 2011 and has since supported a number of military courses and exercises as a subject matter expert and role player, particularly when they involve an ambassador, country team and the interagency. She serves on the board of trustees for the Una Chapman Cox Foundation and is on the board of the American Academy of Diplomacy.

In 2008 Ms. Canavan transferred to the United States European Command in Stuttgart, Germany where she initially served as the foreign policy advisor to the commander, General John Craddock. In 2009, the new European Command commander, Admiral James Stavridis, asked her to become the first civilian deputy to the commander in addition to foreign policy advisor, and she served in that position until August 2011.

Prior to her assignment to the European Command, she served as United States Ambassador to the Republic of Botswana, while simultaneously serving as the secretary of state’s special representative to the Southern African Development Community (SADC) (2005–2008). From 2001–2005, she served as the director of the Department of State's Foreign Service Institute under Secretary Colin Powell.

In 1998, she was appointed by President Clinton as the U.S. ambassador to the Kingdom of Lesotho. Prior to receiving her ambassadorial appointment, Ms. Canavan was the managing director of Overseas Citizen Services (OCS) in the Bureau of Consular Affairs, during which time OCS handled the evacuations of private American citizens in 12 countries (1996–1998). Her tour in OCS followed three years in Windhoek, Namibia, as the deputy chief of mission.

Canavan entered the Foreign Service in 1976, after serving nearly three years as a Peace Corps volunteer in Zaire, now the Democratic Republic of the Congo. She spent the first three and a half years of her career in the Bureau of African Affairs, serving as a regional affairs officer, staff assistant to the assistant secretary, desk officer and press officer. In 1979, she transferred to Kingston, Jamaica, where she worked on the non-immigrant visa line and served as chief of the NIV section.

Returning to the department in late 1981, Canavan worked briefly in the Office of Caribbean Affairs before starting the five-month Mid-Level Course in February 1982. She then moved over to the Foreign Service Institute’s Orientation Division where she was deputy coordinator and taught the A-100 class and other orientation courses for two and a half years. From March 1985 to March 1987, she was the division chief for Latin America in the Office of Overseas Citizen Services, where her division focused on non-emergency services to Americans, including citizenship determinations. She also worked on task forces for the several terrorist aircraft and ship hijackings that took place during that period.

Building on her initial experience in OCS, Canavan transferred to Tijuana, Mexico, as the chief of American citizen services. As the most visited foreign city by Americans, Tijuana had nearly 20% of all the arrest cases worldwide. She left Tijuana in 1990 to take over the Junior Officer Division in the Office of Career Development and Assignments, and after two years in that position, was selected for senior training at the National War College (Class of ’93).

Ms. Canavan received the Defense Distinguished Civilian Service Award in 2011, Presidential Rank Awards in 2003 and 2007, and throughout her career received numerous other awards, including Senior Performance Pay, Superior Honor Awards, and Meritorious Honor Awards. She retired at the rank of career minister, the second highest in the Foreign Service.

Katherine Canavan was born in Southern California, and has a Bachelor of Arts degree in history from the University of California, Santa Cruz. She is married to Lieutenant General (retired) Michael Canavan.

== Notes ==
Diplomatic posts
Preceded by Bismarck Myrick	U.S. ambassador to Lesotho; 1998–2001	Succeeded by Robert Geers Loftis
Preceded by Ruth A. Davis	Director of the US Foreign Service Institute; 2001–2005	Succeeded by —
Preceded by Emil Skodon	U.S. ambassador to Botswana; 2005–2008	Succeeded by Stephen J. Nolan
