= Cardell Richardson =

American government official (born 1954)

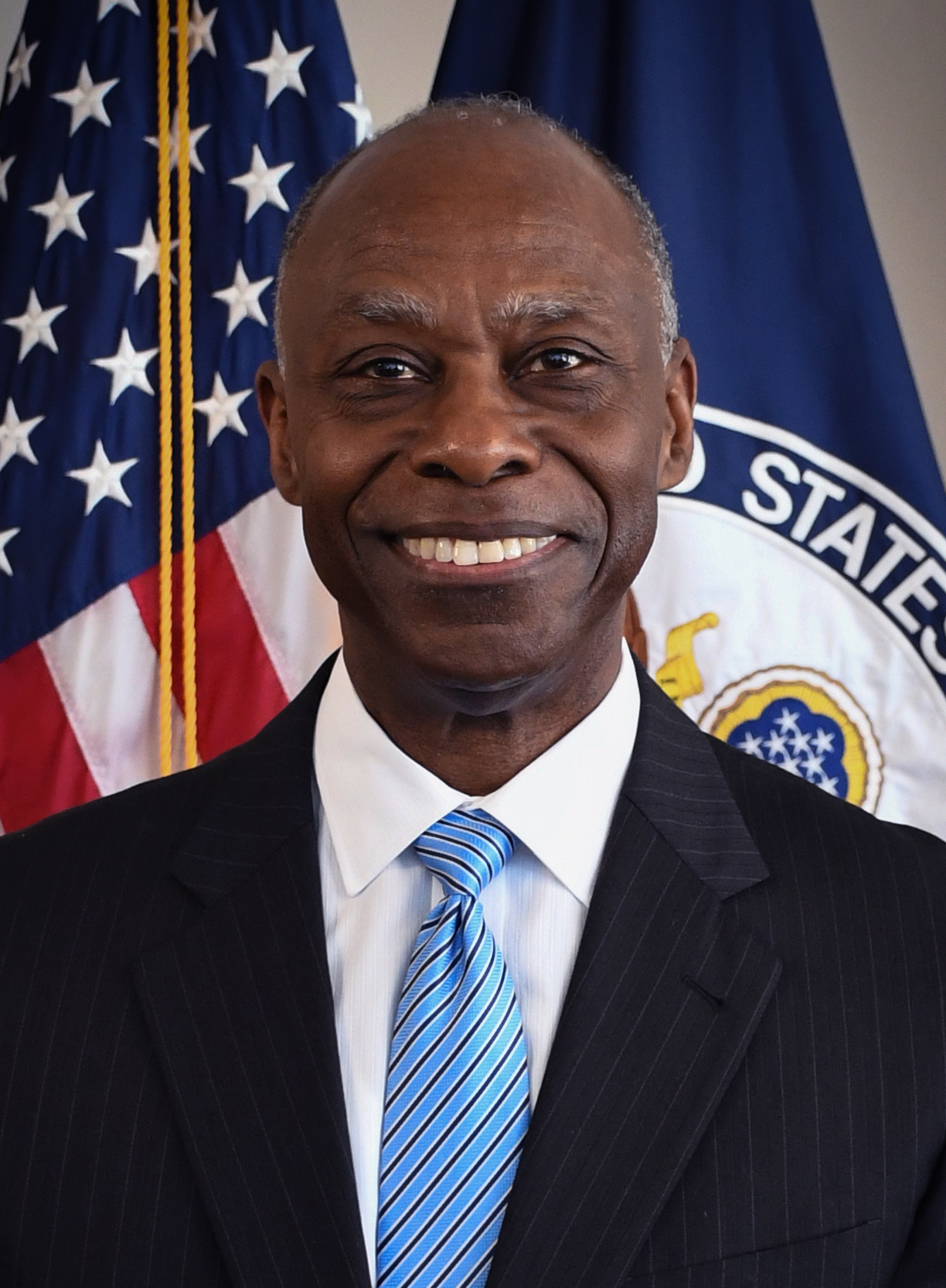
- Official portrait, 2024

17th Inspector General of the Department of State
- In office May 20, 2024 – January 24, 2025
- President: Joe Biden; Donald Trump
- Preceded by: Steve Linick (2020)

Personal details
- Born: Cardell Kenneth Richardson; March 1954 (age 72) Washington, D.C., U.S.
- Spouse: Jackie Taylor (m. 1977)
- Children: 2
- Education: McKinley Technology High School; Howard University (BArch); Webster University (MPA); National Defense University (MSc)
- Occupation: Government official; military officer
- Awards: Presidential Rank Award (2)

Military service
- Allegiance: United States of America
- Branch/service: United States Air Force
- Years of service: 1977–2003
- Rank: Colonel

Cardell Kenneth Richardson (born March 1954) is an American government official and retired United States Air Force colonel who served as the 17th Inspector General of the Department of State.

== Early life and education ==
Cardell Kenneth Richardson was born in March 1954 in Washington, D.C. He is the son of Charles Franklin Richardson, a government official who migrated from North Carolina to Washington, D.C. in the 1940s, and Mary Bernetta Parker Richardson, a Washingtonian government employee. He has at least three siblings. His father died when he was 11 years old. He attended Terrell Junior High School before going to study at McKinley Technology High School.

Richardson holds a Bachelor of Architecture from Howard University, a Master of Public Administration degree from Webster University, and a Master of Science degree in National Resource Strategy from National Defense University. He has also attended the Harvard Kennedy School and the Kellogg School of Management.

== Career ==
Richardson served in the United States Air force for 26 years between 1977 and 2003, obtaining the rank of Colonel.

Richardson worked in the National Geospatial-Intelligence Agency for over two decades, including as the Inspector General.

Richardson was appointed a Defense Intelligence Senior Executive Service in July 2003, after he had retired from the air force.

In July 2023, President Joe Biden nominated Richardson to be the Inspector General of the Department of State. His appointment was confirmed by the Senate on May 2, 2024 and he took office on May 20.

On January 24, 2025, he was fired by President Donald Trump along with several other inspectors general, although the legality of the firings remains under question.

== Personal life ==
Richardson married Jackie Taylor in 1977, and they have two children together. He has previously lived in South Korea and Germany.

Richardson has received the Presidential Rank Award twice.
