= John W. Blaney =

American diplomat (born 1948)

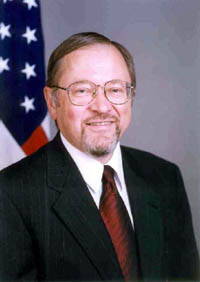

United States Ambassador to Liberia
- In office September 09, 2002 – July 13, 2005
- Preceded by: Bismarck Myrick
- Succeeded by: Donald E. Booth

Personal details
- Born: 1948 (age 77–78) Santa Monica, California

John William Blaney (born 1948) was a United States State Department official and former U.S. ambassador to Liberia. Ambassador Blaney led successfully U.S. efforts to end Liberia's long civil war, including crossing no man's land in 2003 to negotiate an end to the fighting, which enabled the formal peace process in Ghana to conclude successfully the Comprehensive Peace Agreement. For his achievements in Liberia, Ambassador Blaney was awarded the Secretary of State's Distinguished Service Award, the highest diplomatic honor of his nation. Previous diplomatic assignments included chief of mission at the U.S. Embassy in South Africa, director for Southern African affairs at the State Department, presidential designation as the U.S. deputy representative to the ECOSOC of the United Nations, minister-counselor at U.S. Embassy Moscow (as the Soviet Union was disintegrating), and positions working on several nuclear arms control negotiations (including principal drafter and a negotiator of the U.S.-USSR Nuclear Risk Reduction Centers Agreement). He also served as a legislative assistant in both houses of Congress, and as an economist at the U.S. Treasury and State Departments. During the course of his career, Ambassador Blaney received many State Department honors as well as presidential and foreign awards, including Liberia's Order of the Knight Great Band, and an honorary doctorate in political science. He is the author/editor of Successor States to the USSR (Congressional Quarterly Books, 1995), and many journal articles, including "The Art of Strategy Creation for Complex Situations" (PRISM, 5-3, National Defense University, and elsewhere). Prior to his diplomatic career, Blaney served as an officer in the U.S. Army.

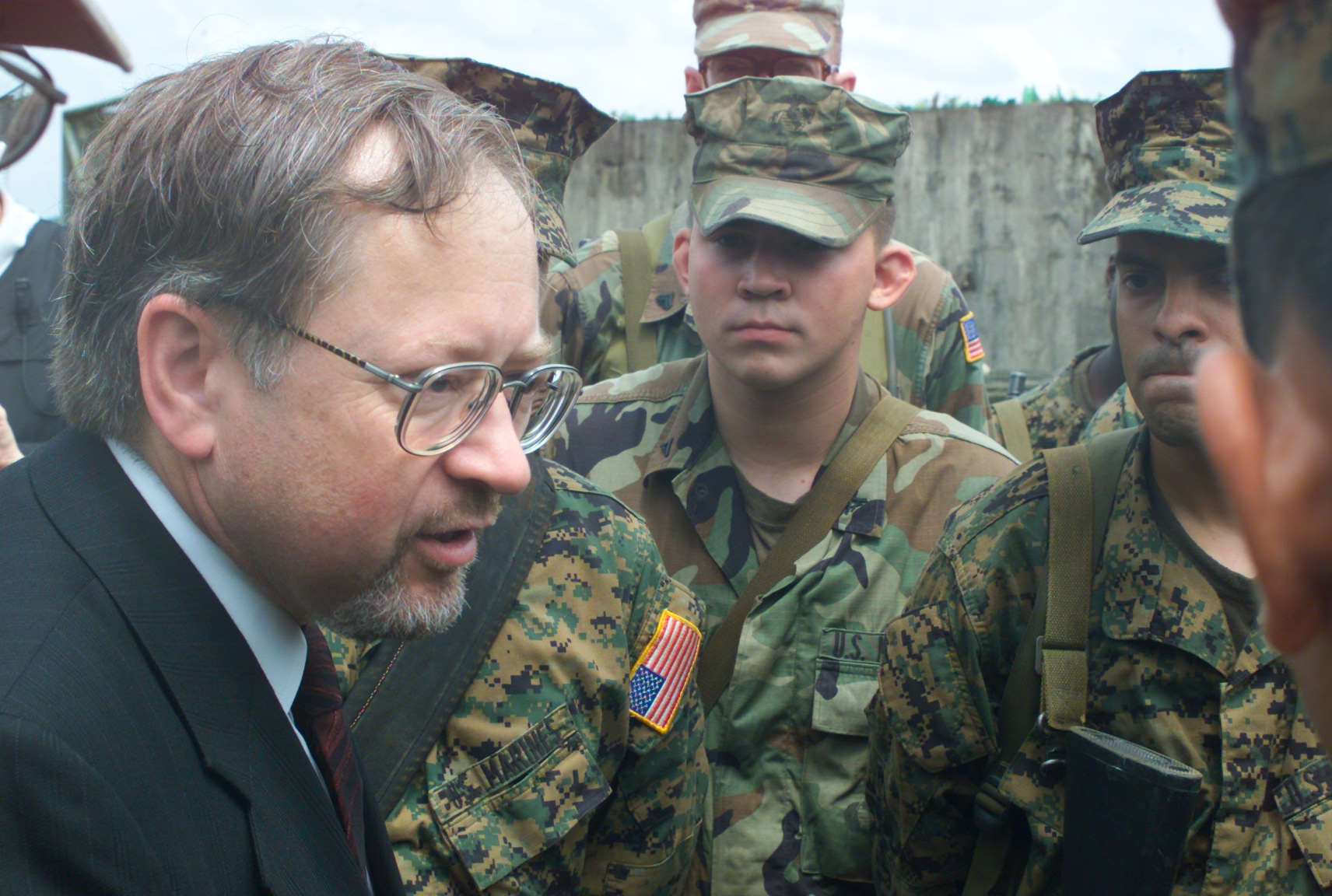
Blaney greeting U.S. Marines at Monrovia's airport during Operation Shining Express

== Early life ==
Blaney graduated from Syracuse University, and he holds a Masters of Science in Foreign Service from Georgetown University.

After retiring from public service, Blaney worked on Wall Street, and later became a senior advisor at Deloitte Consulting. Presently (2022), he is the CEO of Bridge of Gold Entertainment LLC.

== Notes ==
Diplomatic posts
Preceded by Bismarck Myrick	U.S. ambassador to Liberia; 2002–2005	Succeeded by Donald E. Booth
