= Michele Thoren Bond =

American diplomat (born 1953)

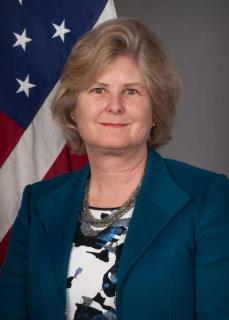

Assistant Secretary of State for Consular Affairs
- In office August 10, 2015 – January 26, 2017; Acting: April 4, 2014 – August 10, 2015
- President: Barack Obama; Donald Trump
- Preceded by: Janice L. Jacobs
- Succeeded by: Carl Risch

United States Ambassador to Lesotho
- In office October 28, 2010 – December 4, 2012
- President: Barack Obama
- Preceded by: Robert B. Nolan
- Succeeded by: Matthew T. Harrington

Personal details
- Born: 1953 (age 72–73)
- Spouse: Clifford G. Bond
- Education: Wellesley College; Georgetown University; National War College

Michele Thoren Bond (born 1953) is a retired U.S. diplomat and former Assistant Secretary of State for Consular Affairs at the U.S. Department of State.

== Early life and education ==
Ambassador Bond grew up in Washington, D.C. She earned a bachelor's degree from Wellesley College, and master's degrees from Georgetown University and the National War College.

== Career ==
Ambassador Bond joined the U.S. Foreign Service in 1977. As a Foreign Service Officer, she has served in Guatemala City, Belgrade, Stockholm, Prague, Moscow, and Amsterdam. She also served as U.S. ambassador to Lesotho from October 28, 2010 to December 4, 2012 under the Obama administration. In April 2014, she became Acting Assistant Secretary for Consular Affairs. In September 2014, President Barack Obama nominated Ambassador Bond to become Assistant Secretary, and she was confirmed by the U.S. Senate in August 2015. https://2009-2017.state.gov/r/pa/ei/biog/231694.htm

== Personal life ==
Ambassador Bond is married to Clifford G. Bond, a retired Foreign Service Officer and former U.S. ambassador to Bosnia-Herzegovina. They have four children.

Diplomatic posts
Preceded by Robert B. Nolan	United States Ambassador to Lesotho; 2010–2012	Succeeded by Matthew T. Harrington
Government offices
Preceded by Janice L. Jacobs	Assistant Secretary of State for Consular Affairs; August 10, 2015 – January 25, 2017	Succeeded by David. T. Donahue; Acting
