= Stephen Akard =

American diplomat (born 1964)

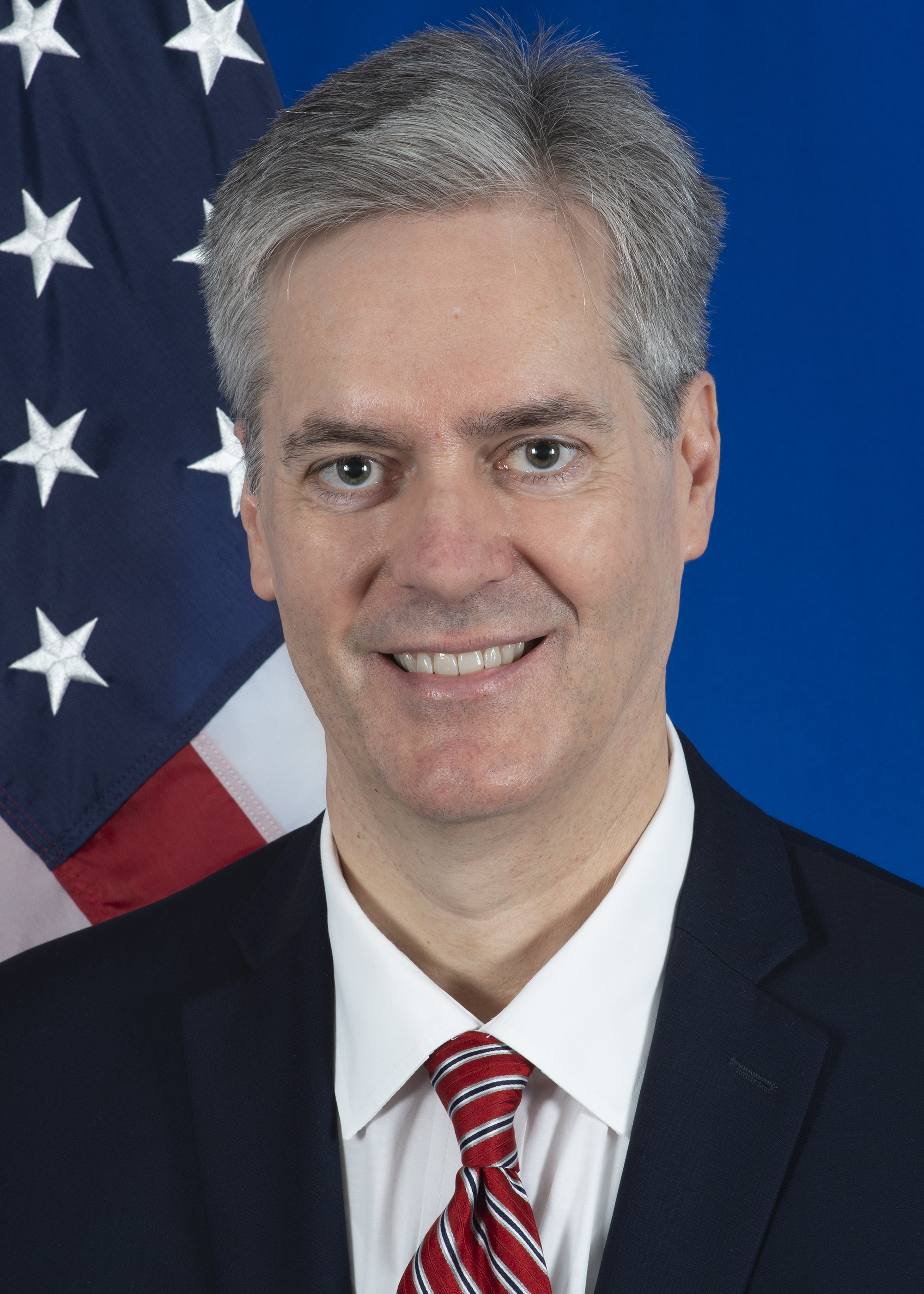

Inspector General of the Department of State
- Acting
- In office May 15, 2020 – August 7, 2020
- President: Donald Trump
- Preceded by: Steve Linick
- Succeeded by: Diana Shaw (acting)

Director of the Office of Foreign Missions
- In office September 16, 2019 – August 7, 2020
- President: Donald Trump
- Preceded by: Gentry O. Smith
- Succeeded by: Rebecca E. Gonzales

Personal details
- Born: Stephen James Akard; 1964 (age 61–62) Indianapolis, Indiana, U.S.
- Education: Indiana University – Purdue University Indianapolis (BA, JD, MBA)

Stephen James Akard (born 1964) is a former American diplomat who was the United States director of the Office of Foreign Missions, a division of the Department of State, and beginning in May 2020 also the acting inspector general of the department after President Donald Trump fired his predecessor, Steve Linick. Akard resigned less than three months later to return to the private sector, according to a department spokeswoman.

== Early life and education ==
Akard is a native of Indianapolis, Indiana. He earned a bachelor's degree in economics and French from Indiana University–Purdue University Indianapolis and a Juris Doctor from the Indiana University McKinney School of Law. He received a Master of Business Administration from the Indiana University Kelley School of Business.

== Career ==
After graduating from law school, Akard practiced law in Indianapolis and was an instructor at the Indiana University Maurer School of Law in Bloomington. He also worked as a law clerk for James E. Noland on the U.S. District Court for the Southern District of Indiana.

Under the George W. Bush administration, he served as special assistant to Secretary of State Colin Powell in the Executive Secretariat, as well as in assorted officer roles at multiple United States embassies between 1997 and 2005.

He served as the senior foreign affairs advisor to Indiana governors Mitch Daniels, Mike Pence, and Eric Holcomb. Akard served as the chief of staff, vice president and general counsel, and director for the Indiana Economic Development Corporation.

Beginning January 2017, he served as senior advisor and acting chief of staff in the Office of the Under Secretary for Economic Growth, Energy, and the Environment.

In October 2017, he was nominated to serve as Director General of the Foreign Service. In March 2018, he withdrew his nomination after State Department officials and lawmakers raised objections that the role should be filled by a more experienced career diplomat and someone less politically connected to the Trump administration.

Akard was confirmed by a vote of 90–2 as the director of the Office of Foreign Missions on September 11, 2019, under President Donald Trump and began service in his role on September 16.

After the firing of incumbent inspector general of the Department of State Steve Linick in May 2020, President Donald Trump announced that Akard would be named as his successor. On August 5, 2020, less than three months after he assumed the IG role, Akard resigned, leaving Deputy Inspector General Diana Shaw serving in an acting position as Inspector General.
