= Diana Shaw =

American attorney and Government official

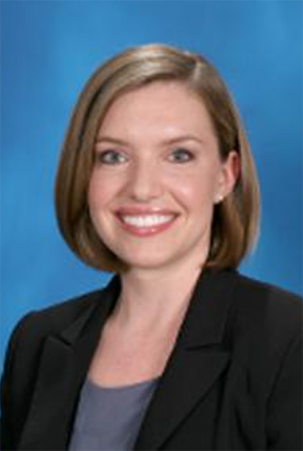

Acting Inspector General of the Department of State
- In office December 11, 2020 – April 5, 2024
- President: Donald Trump; Joe Biden
- Preceded by: Matthew Klimow (acting)
- Succeeded by: Sandra J. Lewis (acting)
- In office August 7, 2020 – August 31, 2020
- President: Donald Trump
- Preceded by: Stephen Akard (acting)
- Succeeded by: Matthew Klimow (acting)

Personal details
- Education: Pepperdine University (BA); University of Southern California (JD); University of Oxford (MA)

Diana Shaw is an American attorney and government official who had served as the acting inspector general of the Department of State.

== Education ==
Shaw earned a Bachelor of Arts degree from Pepperdine University, a Juris Doctor from the USC Gould School of Law, and Master of Arts in English literature from the University of Oxford.

== Career ==
Shaw previously served as Assistant Inspector General of the United States Department of Homeland Security for Special Reviews and Evaluations. She also served as deputy inspector general of the Department of State prior to the departure of Stephen Akard. She retired on April 5, 2024.
