= Inspector General of the Department of State =

U.S. government position

Inspector General of the United States Department of State
- Seal of the Office of Inspector General
- Incumbent; Arne B. Baker (Acting) since May 1, 2025
- Reports to: United States Secretary of State
- Inaugural holder: Raymond C. Miller
- Formation: 1957
- Website: Official website

The inspector general of the Department of State heads the Office of the Inspector General of the Department of State and is responsible for detecting and investigating waste, fraud, abuse, and mismanagement in the United States Department of State. In the department, the inspector general has a rank equivalent to an assistant secretary of state.

== List of inspectors general of the Department of State ==
#	Name	Assumed office	Left office	President served under
1	Raymond C. Miller	November 19, 1957	October 31, 1960	Dwight D. Eisenhower
2	Gerald A. Drew	November 13, 1960	May 31, 1962	Dwight D. Eisenhower and John F. Kennedy
3	Norris S. Haselton	June 10, 1962	July 31, 1964	John F. Kennedy, Lyndon Johnson
4	Fraser Wilkins	July 23, 1964	August 8, 1971	Lyndon B. Johnson, Richard Nixon
5	Thomas W. McElhiney	July 1, 1971	July 18, 1973	Richard Nixon
6	James S. Sutterlin	October 15, 1973	August 31, 1974	Richard Nixon, Gerald Ford
-	Robert L. Yost (acting)	August 31, 1974	April 16, 1975	Gerald Ford
7	William E. Schaufele, Jr.	April 16, 1975	November 29, 1975	Gerald Ford
8	Robert M. Sayre	November 25, 1975	May 1, 1978	Gerald Ford and Jimmy Carter
-	Brandon Grove (acting)	May 1, 1978	July 5, 1978	Jimmy Carter
9	Theodore L. Eliot, Jr.	July 5, 1978	October 16, 1978	Jimmy Carter
10	Robert C. Brewster	January 15, 1979	January 18, 1981	Jimmy Carter
11	Robert Lyle Brown	July 7, 1981	June 30, 1983	Ronald Reagan
12	William Caldwell Harrop	December 12, 1983	August 27, 1986	Ronald Reagan
-	Byron Hollingsworth (acting)	August 27, 1986	August 14, 1987	Ronald Reagan
13	Sherman M. Funk	August 14, 1987	February 15, 1994	Ronald Reagan, George H. W. Bush, and Bill Clinton
-	Roscoe S. Suddarth (acting)	February 15, 1994	June 12, 1994	Bill Clinton
-	Harold W. Geisel (acting)	June 12, 1994	April 7, 1995	Bill Clinton
14	Jacquelyn L. Williams-Bridgers	April 7, 1995	January 31, 2001	Bill Clinton
-	Anne Marie Sigmund (acting)	February 4, 2001	August 3, 2001	George W. Bush
-	Clark Ervin (acting)	August 3, 2001	January 23, 2003	George W. Bush
-	Anne Marie Sigmund (acting)	January 24, 2003	September 28, 2003	George W. Bush
-	Anne W. Patterson (acting)	September 28, 2003	August 3, 2004	George W. Bush
-	John E. Lange (acting)	August 3, 2004	August 23, 2004	George W.Bush
-	Cameron R. Hume (acting)	August 23, 2004	May 2, 2005	George W. Bush
15	Howard Krongard	May 2, 2005	January 15, 2008	George W. Bush
-	William E. Todd (acting)	January 15, 2008	June 2, 2008	George W. Bush
-	Harold W. Geisel (acting)	June 2, 2008	September 30, 2013	George W. Bush and Barack Obama
16	Steve Linick	September 30, 2013	May 15, 2020 (Note: The White House said Trump had dismissed Linick at the request of Secretary of State Mike Pompeo. Linick had been conducting several investigations into actions by Pompeo.)	Barack Obama and Donald Trump
-	Stephen Akard (acting)	May 15, 2020	August 7, 2020	Donald Trump
-	Diana Shaw (acting)	August 7, 2020	August 31, 2020	Donald Trump
-	Matthew Klimow (acting)	August 31, 2020	December 11, 2020	Donald Trump
-	Diana Shaw (acting)	December 11, 2020	April 5, 2024	Donald Trump and Joe Biden
-	Sandra J. Lewis (acting)	April 5, 2024	May 20, 2024	Joe Biden
17	Cardell Richardson	May 20, 2024	January 24, 2025	Joe Biden and Donald Trump
-	Sandra J. Lewis (acting)	January 24, 2025	May 1, 2025	Donald Trump
-	Arne B. Baker (acting)	May 1, 2025	Present	Donald Trump
