= Department of State Office of Inspector General =

U.S. government body

Department of State Office of the Inspector General

Agency overview
- Formed: 1987; 39 years ago
- Headquarters: Harry S. Truman Building, Washington, D.C., United States
- Employees: 300 (as of 2015)
- Annual budget: $135 million (FY 2026)
- Agency executive: Arne B. Baker, Acting Inspector General
- Parent department: U.S. Department of State
- Website: stateoig.gov

The Office of Inspector General for the Department of State (OIG) is an independent office within the U.S. Department of State with a primary responsibility to prevent and detect waste, fraud, abuse, and mismanagement. OIG inspects more than 270 embassies, diplomatic posts, and international broadcasting installations throughout the world to determine whether policy goals are being achieved and whether the interests of the United States are being represented and advanced effectively.

Additionally, OIG performs specialized security inspections and audits in support of the department's mission to provide effective protection to the personnel, facilities, and sensitive information. OIG also audits operations and activities of the department and the U.S. Agency for Global Media (USAGM) to ensure that they are as effective, efficient, and economical as possible. Finally, OIG investigates instances of fraud, waste, and mismanagement that may constitute either criminal wrongdoing or violation of Department and USAGM regulations. OIG is a member of the Council of the Inspectors General on Integrity and Efficiency.

== Mandate ==
The Inspector General Act of 1978 mandated many federal departments to create Offices of Inspector General. The Act imposed a requirement on inspectors general to report both to their agency heads and to Congress. The Inspector General of the Department of State was one of the last federal OIGs to be created.

The Department of State established an internal inspection office in 1906 (S/IG) – however, this function transferred to the OIG under the Foreign Service Act of 1980. The Omnibus Diplomatic Security and Antiterrorism Act of 1986, section 4861, specifically directed "the Secretary of State to proceed immediately to establish an Office of Inspector General of the Department of State not later than October 1, 1986…" This section includes duties and responsibilities authorized, and limitations on the appointment of an inspector general.

== Offices ==
=== Office of Audits ===
The Office of Audits has a leading role in helping the U.S. Department of State and USAGM improve management; strengthen integrity and accountability; and ensure the most efficient, effective, and economical use of resources. Their activities are global in scope, supporting the highest priorities of the department. They also provide oversight for the United States Section, International Boundary and Water Commission (IBWC).

=== Office of Inspections ===
The Office of Inspections provides the Secretary of State and Congress with systematic and independent evaluations of the operations of the department, its posts abroad, and related activities. OIG schedules an inspection of each post and bureau within a 5-year cycle in accordance with the Foreign Service Act of 1980.

=== Office of Investigations ===
The Office of Investigations is committed to addressing allegations in an independent and objective manner, conducting criminal, civil and administrative investigations affecting programs and operations, encouraging professional development, and assisting the department and agencies in preventing, as well as detecting, fraud.

=== Office of General Counsel ===
The Office of General Counsel provides legal advice to the Inspector General, his senior staff, and others in OIG on the full range of activities within OIG, including inspections, investigations and audits. OGC is responsible for managing OIG's Freedom of Information Act (FOIA) and Privacy Act programs. The Counsel to the Inspector General reports to the Inspector General, and is independent from the State Department's Legal Adviser and USAGM's General Counsel.

=== Office of Evaluations and Special Projects ===
The Office of Evaluations and Special Projects was established in 2014 to strengthen OIG's oversight of the Department and USAGM, and to improve OIG's capabilities to meet statutory requirements of the Whistleblower Protection Enhancement Act of 2012. ESP will fulfill OIG's whistleblower protection duties by educating Department and USAGM employees and contractors on the protections from retaliation for disclosing fraud, waste, or abuse.

=== Congressional & Public Affairs ===
The Congressional & Public Affairs team facilitates effective working relationships between the OIG and Congress and act as a liaison with Congress and the media to explain OIG initiatives and programs and to promote the activities of all OIG offices.

=== Office of the Executive Director ===
The Office of the Executive Director provides administrative support services to the Bureau of the Office of Inspector General. The Executive Office provides support services in the areas of Budget, Human Resources, Information Technology, Workforce Planning, Reports and Publications, and General Support Services (GSO). The office is headed by the Assistant Inspector General for Administration.

== Hotline ==
The OIG's Hotline is a clearinghouse for receiving and handling allegations regarding fraud, waste, abuse, mismanagement or misconduct affecting Department of State and USAGM programs and operations. Examples of allegations that should be reported to the OIG Hotline include: false claims; contract fraud; computer crimes; bribes and gratuities; conflict of interest and ethics violations; significant mismanagement and waste of funds; theft from programs receiving federal funds; theft of government property; embezzlement of government funds; and standards of conduct violations.

== Vacancy during Clinton tenure ==
Throughout the tenure of Secretary of State Hillary Clinton, there was no permanent inspector general at the State Department. Moreover, President Barack Obama did not nominate anyone for that position while Clinton was Secretary. Although the office remained running under Harold W. Geisel—a State Department employee—the "Government Accountability Office, lawmakers from both parties and nonprofit groups" criticized the delay in identifying a nominee, and called for the position to be filled by an inspector independent of the State Department.
