= Howard Krongard =

American government official (1940–2023)

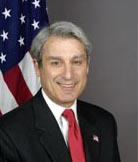

15th Inspector General of the Department of State
- In office May 2, 2005 – January 16, 2008
- President: George W. Bush
- Preceded by: Jacquelyn L. Williams-Bridgers
- Succeeded by: Steve A. Linick

Personal details
- Born: December 12, 1940
- Died: May 3, 2023 (aged 82)
- Children: Kenneth Krongard, Mara Krongard
- Relatives: A. B. Krongard (brother)
- Education: Baltimore City College; Princeton University (BA); Harvard University (JD); Trinity Hall, Cambridge

Howard J. "Cookie" Krongard (December 12, 1940 – May 3, 2023) was an American attorney and government official who served as Inspector General of the Department of State during the George W. Bush administration. After being accused of averting probes into contracting fraud in Iraq and a possible conflict of interest regarding investigations into Blackwater Worldwide, Krongard left his post on January 15, 2008, and was not eligible for retirement.

== Early life ==
Krongard was raised in Baltimore, Maryland in a Jewish family. He was the brother of former CIA Executive Director A. B. Krongard. He graduated in 1961 with a degree in history from Princeton University, and was a First Team All-American goaltender in lacrosse, which earned him a place in the National Lacrosse Hall of Fame. He graduated from Harvard Law School in 1964, then did postgraduate work at the Trinity Hall, Cambridge from 1964 to 1965.

== Career ==
From 1989 to 1996, Krongard was a lawyer with Deloitte & Touche and its predecessor firm, Deloitte Haskins & Sells. From 1996 to 2005, Krongard was a lawyer with Freshfields Bruckhaus Deringer.

=== Government ===
Krongard served as the Inspector General of the Department of State from May 2, 2005, to December 7, 2007.

== Controversies ==
=== State Department probes ===
In a 14-page letter on September 18, 2007, House Oversight Committee chairman Henry Waxman charged Krongard with actively impeding probes into waste and corruption related to the war in Iraq and other matters. In a three-page follow-up letter issued on September 28, 2007, Waxman informed Krongard that allegations of witness intimidation had been made against Krongard's staff.

Aides to Krongard threatened two U.S. State Department investigators with retaliation, including termination of their jobs, if they cooperated with the investigations into Blackwater USA and Krongard, according to a report released by the U.S. House of Representatives. Krongard directly interfered with federal prosecutors when they asked his office for help with investigating possible Blackwater arms smuggling. In an e-mail, he wrote, to his staff,

is directed to stop IMMEDIATELY any work on these contracts until I receive a briefing from the (assistant U.S. attorney) regarding the details of this investigation. SA Militana, ASAIC Rubendall and any others involved are to be directed by you not to proceed in any manner until the briefing takes place,

That was sent to a subordinate on July 11, 2007, and was disclosed by Waxman's congressional investigation, who revealed the e-mails. Krongard denied this, however.

On November 14, 2007, Krongard testified to Congress, regarding his brother,

I can tell you, very frankly, I am not aware of any financial interest or position he has with respect to Blackwater. When these ugly rumors started recently, I specifically asked him. I do not believe it is true that he is a member of the advisory board that you stated. And that's something I think I need to say.

However, Krongard was confronted with a July 26 letter from Blackwater founder and CEO Erik Prince to A.B. Krongard asking him to join Blackwater's advisory board, followed by a September 5 letter welcoming Krongard to the board and a report from Rep. Elijah Cummings stating that A.B. Krongard had been expected to attend a Blackwater board meeting earlier that week. Krongard then called his brother during the ensuing break in the hearings and learned of this conflict of interest for the first time, saying "I'm not my brother's keeper, and we don't discuss our business with each other". He then recused himself from the investigation. Democrats on the committee argued that this had a negative impact on Krongard's credibility, which also cast doubt on his denials of the accusations of interfering with Justice Department investigations of Blackwater and other State Department contractors. Committee chairman Henry Waxman issued a memorandum summarizing the discrepancies between the two brothers' recollections of what they told each other.

== Personal life and death ==
Howard Krongard lived in the Upper Montclair section of Montclair, New Jersey, for over 30 years, and had a son and a daughter.

Krongard died after a long battle with cancer on May 3, 2023, at the age of 82.
