= A. B. Krongard =

Executive Director of the CIA

Alvin Bernard "Buzzy" Krongard (born October 25, 1936) was the executive director of the Central Intelligence Agency. He was appointed by George Tenet on March 16, 2001.

The Executive Director is the third ranking position within the CIA and the incumbent functions essentially as the Chief Operating Officer of the Agency. For three years prior, Krongard had served as Counselor to the Director of Central Intelligence (DCI).

A longtime consultant to DCIs, Krongard joined the Agency full-time in February 1998, following a 29-year business career. During his private sector career, he was Chief Executive Officer and Chairman of Alex. Brown & Sons, the nation's oldest investment banking firm, and Vice Chairman of Bankers Trust.

Krongard graduated from Princeton University with an A.B. in philosophy in 1958 after completing a senior thesis titled "The Nature and Meaning of Religious Propositions." He then received a Juris Doctor degree from the University of Maryland School of Law. While at Princeton, Krongard played lacrosse. In 1980, he was inducted as a member of the National Lacrosse Hall of Fame. Krongard played for the storied amateur Mount Washington Lacrosse Club. He served three years of active duty as an infantry officer in the United States Marine Corps.

Krongard resigned from the CIA shortly after the arrival of DCI Porter Goss in September 2004. While at the CIA, he was the connection between Erik Prince of Blackwater Security Consulting and the CIA. Through his influence, Blackwater was able to receive its first black contract.

On March 18, 2005, Krongard was appointed as an outside US director to the Global Board of Directors organized to oversee and coordinate the worldwide operations of DLA Piper, one of the world's largest law firms.

== Family ==
Krongard was raised in Baltimore, Maryland in a Jewish family, and resides in Baltimore, Maryland and McLean, Virginia. His brother was Howard "Cookie" Krongard (1940 – 2023) was Inspector General of the Department of State during the George W. Bush administration.

He was married to the late Patricia A. Lion and has three adult sons. He is Jewish.

Patrica Lion's sister, Margo Lion, is a Broadway theatre producer.

On 31 July 2004 Krongard married Cheryl Gordon (née Cheryl Gruetzmacher), at that time a senior executive for Apollo Management. She has since become a director of Legg Mason and US Airways.

== Controversies ==
=== 9/11 ===
Krongard's name was brought up in conjunction with investigations into suspected 9/11-related insider trading because of timely Wall Street trades made through the investment bank he used to head, Alex. Brown.

The 9/11 Commission Report stated:

A single U.S.-based institutional investor with no conceivable ties to al Qaeda purchased 95 percent of the UAL puts on September 6 (2001) as part of a strategy that also included buying 115,000 shares of American on September 10. Similarly, much of the seemingly suspicious trading on September 10 was traced to a specific U.S.-based options trading newsletter...which recommended these trades.

=== Blackwater ===
At a November 14, 2007 House oversight committee hearing about Blackwater, investigating allegations of improper interference by Krongard's brother, Howard, in Justice Department investigations of Blackwater and other State Department contractors, Chairman Henry Waxman stated that A. B. Krongard was on "Blackwater's advisory board". Howard Krongard at first denied that his brother had any connection with Blackwater, saying:

I can tell you, very frankly, I am not aware of any financial interest or position he has with respect to Blackwater. When these ugly rumors started recently, I specifically asked him. I do not believe it is true that he is a member of the advisory board that you stated. And that's something I think I need to say.

However, when confronted with a July 26 letter from Blackwater founder and CEO Erik Prince to Buzzy Krongard asking him to join Blackwater's advisory board, followed by a September 5 letter welcoming Krongard to the board and a report from Rep. Elijah Cummings stating that Buzz Krongard had been expected to attend a Blackwater board meeting earlier that week, Krongard said he had called his brother during the ensuing break in the hearings and learned of this conflict of interest for the first time, saying "I'm not my brother's keeper, and we don't discuss our business with each other". He then recused himself from the investigation. Committee chairman Henry Waxman issued a memorandum summarizing the discrepancies between the two brothers' recollections of what Buzzy told Howard.
