= Office of Foreign Missions =

Office of the United States Department of State

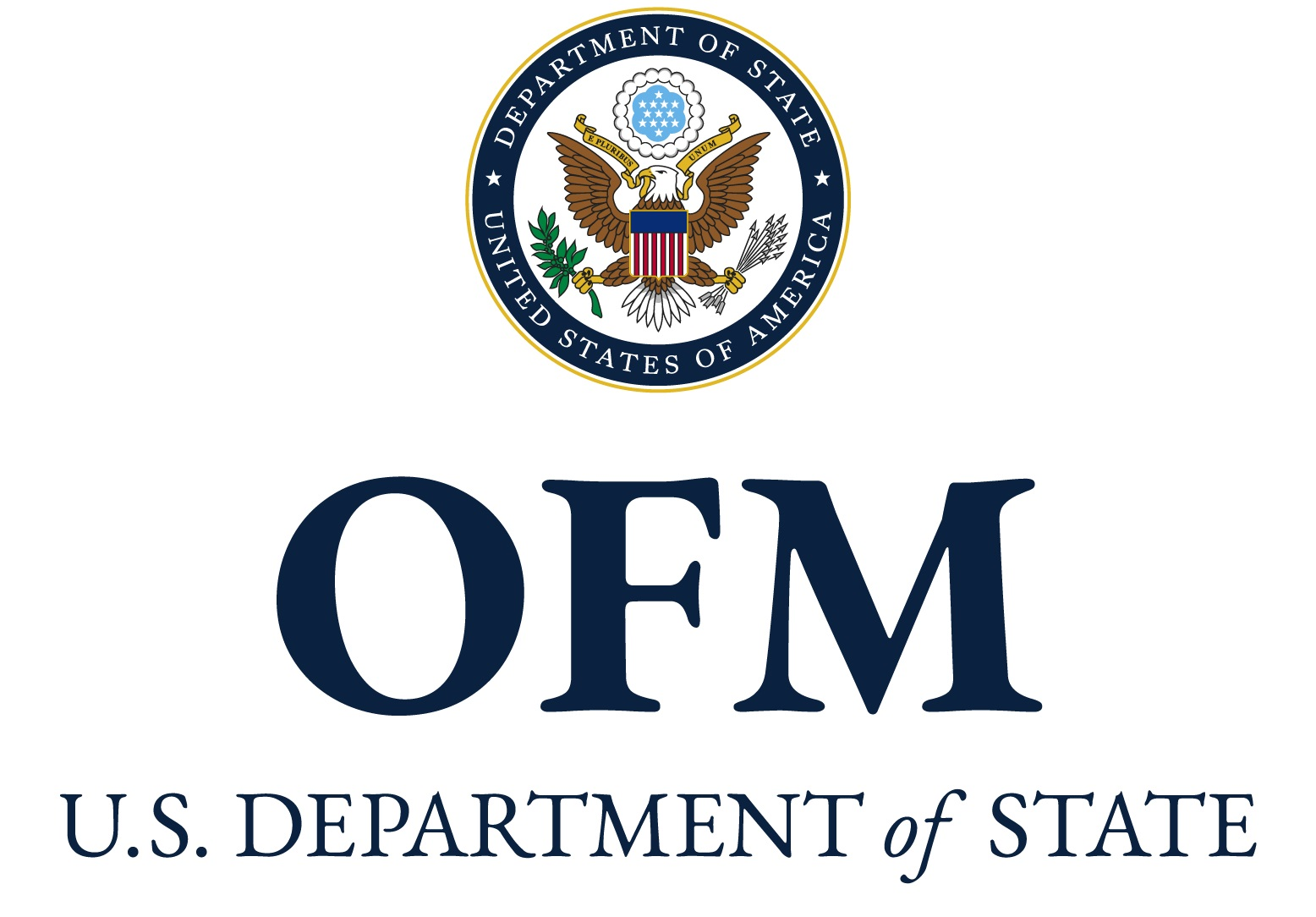

Agency overview
- Formed: 1982
- Headquarters: 2201 C Street NW Room 2236 Washington, D.C. 20520
- Agency executive: Lew Olowski (Senior Bureau Official), Director of the Office of Foreign Missions
- Parent agency: Under Secretary for Management
- Website: state.gov/ofm

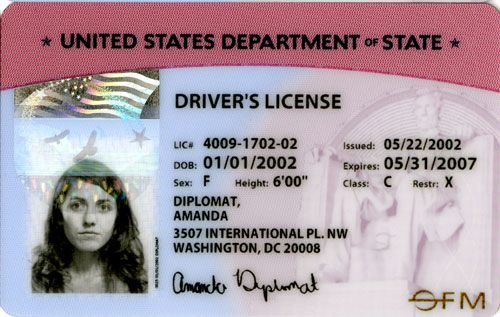
Driver's license issued by the OFM to foreign officials in the United States and their non-US dependents.

The Office of Foreign Missions (OFM) is a component of the United States Department of State that provides services to American diplomatic personnel abroad and foreign diplomats residing in the United States.

== History ==
It was created by the U.S. Congress to help implement the Foreign Missions Act of 1982, which provides the legal foundation for facilitating secure and efficient operations of U.S. missions abroad and of foreign missions and international organizations in the United States; pursuant to the act, the OFM ensures all diplomatic benefits, privileges, and immunities are properly exercised in accordance with federal laws and international agreements.

== Mission ==
The Office of Foreign Missions has four missions.

1. Ensure equitable treatment for United States diplomatic and consular missions abroad and their personnel through reciprocity;
2. Regulate the activities of foreign missions in the United States in a manner that will protect the foreign policy and national security interests of the United States;
3. Ensure compliance of diplomatic privileges and immunities for foreign diplomats and officials residing in the United States to enhance U.S. security;
4. Provide appropriate privileges, benefits, and services on a reciprocal basis to the foreign mission community in the United States.

As an advocate for reciprocal agreements, OFM presses for fair treatment of U.S. personnel abroad while assuring foreign diplomats based in the United States receive the same treatment that each respective government provides in return. Additionally, OFM assists foreign missions in dealing with local government offices in the United States.

OFM also provides a range of services to the foreign diplomatic community, including issuance of vehicle titles, vehicle registrations, driver's licenses, and license plates; processing of tax exemption and duty-free customs requests; and facilitation of property acquisitions through local zoning law procedures. By assisting, advising, and regulating services for foreign diplomats, their dependents, and their staffs while residing in the United States.

Finally, OFM establishes and maintains relationships with U.S. law enforcement and security communities at the national, state, and local levels to educate them about diplomatic privilege and immunity issues.

== See also ==
- United States Department of State
- List of diplomatic missions in the United States
- International Chancery Center
