= Reprise =

Section of a musical work where the opening material is repeated

In music, a reprise (/rəˈpriːz/ rə-PREEZ, French: [ʁəpʁiz]; from the verb reprendre 'to resume') is the repetition or reiteration of the opening material later in a composition as occurs in the recapitulation of sonata form, though—originally in the 18th century—was simply any repeated section, such as is indicated by beginning and ending repeat signs.

A partial or abbreviated reprise is known as a petite reprise (/pəˌtiːt rəˈpriːz/ pə-TEET rə-PREEZ, French: [p(ə)tit ʁəpʁiz]). In Baroque music this usually occurs at the very end of a piece, repeating the final phrase with added ornamentation.

== Song reprises ==
Reprise can refer to a version of a song which is similar to, yet different from, the song on which it is based. One example could be "Time", the fourth song from Pink Floyd's 1973 album The Dark Side of the Moon, which contains a reprise of "Breathe", the second song of the same album. Pink Floyd's 1979 album The Wall also features a reprise in the form of In the Flesh?/In the Flesh, with the former being the opening track, and the latter being a song towards the end of the record. Another example could be "Solo", the fifth song from Frank Ocean's 2016 album Blonde, and then "Solo (Reprise)", the tenth song of the same album. Be Here Now, the 1997 album by Oasis, features a reprise of "All Around the World", while the title track of Sgt. Pepper's Lonely Hearts Club Band, which plays at the start of the album to introduce it, has a reprise at the end of the album to close it by replacing lines like "we hope you will enjoy the show" with "we hope you have enjoyed the show". Impera by Ghost features a reprise on the final track, "Respite on the Spitalfields", of a riff previously featured in the opening track, "Imperium".

=== Musical theater ===
In musical theatre and opera, reprises are any repetition of an earlier song or theme, usually with changed lyrics and shortened music to reflect the development of the story. Also, it is common for songs sung by the same character or regarding the same narrative motif to have similar tunes and lyrics, or incorporate similar tunes and lyrics. For example, in the stage version of Les Misérables, a song of the primary antagonist ("Javert's Suicide") is similar in lyrics and exactly the same in tune to a soliloquy of the protagonist when he was in a similar emotional state ("What Have I Done?"). At the end of the song, an instrumental portion is played from an earlier soliloquy of the antagonist, in which he was significantly more confident. Les Misérables in general reprises many musical themes..

Often the reprised version of a song has exactly the same tune and lyrics as the original, though frequently featuring different characters singing or including them with the original character in the reprised version. For example, in The Sound of Music, the reprise of the title song is sung by the Von Trapp children and their father, the Captain; whereas the original was sung by Maria. In "Edelweiss" (reprise), the entire Von Trapp family and Maria sing and are later joined by the audience, whereas the original features Liesl and the Captain..

Also, in the musical The Music Man, the love song "Goodnight My Someone" uses the same basic melody (though with a more ballad quality to it) as the rousing march and theme song "Seventy-Six Trombones"; in the reprised versions, Harold and Marian are heard singing a snatch of each other's songs. And in Jerome Kern and Oscar Hammerstein II's Show Boat, the song "Ol' Man River" is reprised three times after it is first sung, as if it were a commentary on the situation in the story. In some musicals, a reprise of an earlier song is sung by a different character from the one who originally sang it, with different lyrics.

In Mamma Mia! (both the musical and its film adaptation), however, the reprises for the title track, Dancing Queen, and Waterloo have no altering of the lyrics, and are just shortened versions of the originals featured earlier.

In RENT, the song, "I'll Cover You" gets a reprise at Angel's funeral. It is sung primarily by Collins and is slower and more emotional to reflect Collins' emotional state. Nearing the end of the song, the rest of the company begins singing a slower version of the first verse of "Seasons of Love". In addition, the second half of "Goodbye Love" features the piano playing an instrumental which is a faster version of the instrumental in "Halloween".

In Hamilton, the song, "Best of Wives and Best of Women" reprises the song "It's Quiet Uptown" with the same melody and similar lyrics, along with "The Story of Tonight" and "Ten Duel Commandments" being reprised several times.

In Frozen, the song, "For The First Time In Forever (reprise)" reprises the song "For The First Time In Forever" by Kristen Bell and Idina Menzel. Both versions are sung by the same artists.

In the Gilbert and Sullivan operetta Iolanthe, the song "If you go in you're sure to win", sung by the Chancellor and his two lordly friends, gets a reprise in the final song "Soon as we may, off and away", sung by the whole ensemble, with the same melody, but with only two verses instead of three.

=== Winner reprise ===
In musical competitions, it's named reprise or winner reprise to the winner's last performance, once its victory is proclaimed, and before the end of show. This tradition began in San Remo Festival (1951) and was adopted by several competitions, as Eurovision Song Contest.

== In literature ==
In postmodernism, the term reprise has been borrowed from musical terminology to be used in literary criticism by Christian Moraru:

....with postmodern authors or scriptors, representation-as-repetition challenges representation-as-origination. They set forth the alternate model of an esthétique du recyclage [aesthetic recycling] ... Anything but "neoclassical" or humbly imitative, driven by a complex cultural-aesthetic agenda, this model plays upon discriminate and polemical "repetition," upon a critical reprise, to borrow—or reprise, in my turn—a term from music and adapt it to underscore the strategic difference toward which postmodernism's repetitive acts are frequently geared....postmodernism's self-acknowledged reprises ever so often surprise us with their unexpected plot twists, media mixes, and other deflections, inflections, and irreverent revisions, both textual and contextual, sociocultural. – Christian Moraru

From the postmodern perspective, reprise is a fundamental device in the whole history of art.

== See also ==
- Hidden track, a song that is placed on a music release in a way that avoids detection by the casual listener.
- Cover version, a new version of a song originated by a different artist.
