= My Shot =

2015 song from the musical Hamilton

Song by Lin-Manuel Miranda, Anthony Ramos, Daveed Diggs, Okieriete Onaodowan, Leslie Odom Jr., and the cast of Hamilton

from the album Hamilton
- Released: 2015
- Genre: Hip hop; show tune
- Length: 5:33
- Songwriters: Lin-Manuel Miranda; Albert Johnson; Kejuan Waliek Muchita; Osten Harvey, Jr.; Roger Troutman; Christopher Wallace

Audio
- "My Shot" on YouTube

"My Shot" is the third song from Act 1 of the musical Hamilton, based on the life of Alexander Hamilton, which premiered on Broadway in 2015. Lin-Manuel Miranda wrote both the music and lyrics to the song.

== Background ==
In a 2020 interview with Rotten Tomatoes, Miranda stated that "My Shot" took him a year to write. He mentioned that he tried to challenge himself as he was writing the song to use as few lines as possible to get the message of the song across.

== Synopsis ==
In 1776, having just emigrated from the island of Nevis to New York City, 19-year-old Alexander Hamilton wows several other young revolutionaries with his verbal skills, speaking about his hopes for the future, his disillusionment with the British, and his desire to be remembered, even if it means dying.

The song's chorus features the line "I am not throwing away my shot," which shows Alexander's desire to not give away his chance to become an important figure in the birth of his nation. The chorus also features a line about him being just like his country. He describes that he is young, scrappy and hungry, similar to his newly founded nation, that is struggling in the Revolutionary War.

The other revolutionaries, who also rap about their own hopes for and reservations about the future, are:

- Marquis de Lafayette, a Frenchman who does not want to live under a monarch's rule. He mentions his fighting abilities and the possibility of a revolution in France, after Alexander hints at the imminent American revolution.
- Hercules Mulligan, a tailor's apprentice who wants to socially advance by joining the revolution.
- John Laurens, an abolitionist who will not be satisfied until all men have equal rights. He dreams of riding into battle with America's first all-black regiment. He also has a part in the song where he talks about rising up toward the British forces.
- Aaron Burr, who reminds all of the men to keep quiet because loyalists may be among them.

Despite Burr's warnings, the men continue rapping about the rebellion and encouraging other Americans to rise up with them against the British, while Burr remains silent. The tune is reprised during the songs "Right Hand Man", "Yorktown (The World Turned Upside Down)", and "Non-Stop", while some of the themes and lyrics are revisited in "The World Was Wide Enough". The number contains interpolations of lyrics from the rap songs "Shook Ones (Part II)" by Mobb Deep and "Going Back to Cali" by The Notorious B.I.G. It also contains a lyric from "You've Got to Be Carefully Taught", from South Pacific by Rodgers and Hammerstein. These sources are credited in the credits of the 2020 filmed version of Hamilton.

== Analysis ==
Vibe described the backing as "reminiscent of the '90s". The Los Angeles Times said the song had "Eminem combustion". Vulture said the song was reminiscent of Eminem's "Lose Yourself". TapInto notes that this song becomes ironic by the end of the musical because Hamilton does, indeed, throw away his shot in the fatal duel with Aaron Burr. Deadline notes that "I am not throwing away my shot" becomes Hamilton's mantra.

== Critical reception ==
TapInto deemed it a "ferocious song". The Huffington Post suggested the song would make a good opening number to the musical.

In June 2026, CBS News included the song in its list of the 250 essential American songs of the past 250 years.

== Popular culture ==
The song was one of many performed at the White House in March 2016.

A parody of the song was performed by Miranda as his opening monologue on the October 8, 2016, episode of Saturday Night Live.

The song was parodied and performed by The Roots during The Tonight Show Starring Jimmy Fallon's "Football Raps" segment on August 3, 2017.

On March 9, 2021, a group of doctors called "Vax'n 8" released a remix of the song and a video called "My Shot: A COVID Vaccine Adaptation" to inspire people to get vaccinated for COVID-19.

== Certifications ==
Region	Certification	Certified units/sales
United Kingdom (BPI)	Silver	200,000^{‡}
United States (RIAA)	2× Platinum	2,000,000^{‡}
^{‡} Sales+streaming figures based on certification alone.

== Mixtape version ==
"My Shot (Rise Up Remix)"

Song by The Roots featuring Busta Rhymes, Joell Ortiz, and Nate Ruess

from the album The Hamilton Mixtape
- Released: 2016
- Genre: Hip hop
- Length: 4:30
- Songwriter: Lin-Manuel Miranda

Audio
- "My Shot (Rise Up Remix)" on YouTube

"My Shot (Rise Up Remix)" is a song recorded by The Roots featuring Busta Rhymes, Joell Ortiz, and Nate Ruess from The Hamilton Mixtape. The song peaked at number 16 on the R&B/Hip-Hop Digital Song Sales chart. It was featured in the credits of the filmed version of the musical on Disney+.
