= The Hamilton Mixtape =

2016 mixtape album from the musical Hamilton

Mixtape by various artists
- Released: December 2, 2016
- Recorded: 2015–2016
- Genres: Hip-hop; R&B; pop
- Length: 73:43
- Label: Atlantic
- Producers: Aaron Pearce; Alicia Keys; Andy Thompson; Bill Sherman; Emile Haynie; Francis Farewell Starlite; Frequency; ID Labs; !llmind; Jason Halbert; J.PERIOD; John Legend; Leo Abrahams; Lin-Manuel Miranda; Mike Elizondo; Regina Spektor; Shockwave; Stro Elliot; Supa Dups; The Roots; The Social Experiment; Tony Esterly; Trooko; Watsky

Professional ratings
Aggregate scores
Source	Rating
Metacritic	77/100
Review scores
Source	Rating
Pitchfork	4.8/10
Rolling Stone	3.5/4 stars

The Hamilton Mixtape is a 2016 mixtape album featuring assorted (and deleted) songs from the 2015 Broadway musical Hamilton performed by various artists, including Common, Kelly Clarkson, Wiz Khalifa, Nas, Alicia Keys, John Legend, Dessa, Miguel, Chance the Rapper, Nate Ruess, K’naan, Aloe Blacc, and the Roots. It was widely well received by critics.

== Background ==
In 2009, Lin-Manuel Miranda began a project titled The Hamilton Mixtape that would eventually transform into the 2015 Broadway musical Hamilton. During the development of the musical production, Miranda frequently communicated that a "mixtape" of select songs from the show's score was being recorded.

On November 3, 2016, Miranda announced on Twitter that the mixtape was complete and would be released on December 2, 2016. Preorders for the album began on November 4, 2016, and two songs were officially released: Kelly Clarkson's "It's Quiet Uptown" and The Roots' "My Shot." "The following Friday, at midnight in all time zones, "Satisfied" and "Immigrants (We Get The Job Done)" were released, followed by "Wait For It" and "Wrote My Way Out" the Friday after. In addition to its digital, compact disc and vinyl record releases, a 12-song cassette tape version of the album was also made available on February 10, 2017, featuring the original explicit versions of the songs.

== Commercial performance ==
The Hamilton Mixtape debuted at number one on the Billboard 200 with 187,000 album-equivalent units, of which 169,000 were pure album sales. It marks the largest sales in a week for a compilation album since Cruel Summer by GOOD Music in 2012, and is the first compilation album to reach number one since Now 50 in 2014. According to Nielsen Music, the cassette version of the album sold just under 3,000 units in the year of 2017, in conjunction with the increase of overall cassette sales increasing by 35 percent the same year.

== Track listing ==
No.	Title	Writer(s)	Producer(s)	Length
1.	"No John Trumbull (Intro)" (The Roots)	Lin-Manuel Miranda	Ahmir Thompson; Tariq Trotter; The Wurx; J.Period	0:46
2.	"My Shot (Rise Up Remix)" (The Roots featuring Busta Rhymes, Joell Ortiz and Nate Ruess)	Miranda; Trotter; Trevor Smith; Ortiz; Albert Johnson; Kejuan Waliek Muchita; Osteen Harvey, Jr.; Roger Troutman; Christopher Wallace	Mike Elizondo	4:31
3.	"Wrote My Way Out" (Nas, Dave East, Lin-Manuel Miranda and Aloe Blacc)	Miranda; Nasir Jones; David Brewster; Egbert Dawkins III	Illmind	4:21
4.	"Wait for It" (Usher)	Miranda	Dwayne "Supa Dups" Chin-Quee	3:28
5.	"An Open Letter (Interlude)" (Watsky featuring Shockwave)	Miranda	Shockwave; Bill Sherman	1:08
6.	"Satisfied" (Sia featuring Miguel and Queen Latifah)	Miranda	Elizondo; Tony Esterly^{[a]}	5:18
7.	"Dear Theodosia" (Regina Spektor featuring Ben Folds)	Miranda	Leo Abrahams; Spektor	2:25
8.	"Valley Forge (Demo)" (Lin-Manuel Miranda)	Miranda	Miranda	2:46
9.	"It's Quiet Uptown" (Kelly Clarkson)	Miranda	Jason Halbert	4:37
10.	"That Would Be Enough" (Alicia Keys)	Miranda	Emile Haynie; Keys	4:04
11.	"Immigrants (We Get the Job Done)" (K'naan, Snow tha Product, Riz MC and Residente)	Miranda; Keinan Warsame; Claudia Feliciano; Rizwan Ahmed; René Pérez Joglar; Jeffrey Penalva	Trooko	4:41
12.	"You'll Be Back" (Jimmy Fallon and the Roots)	Miranda	Thompson; Trotter; James Poyser	4:10
13.	"Helpless" (Ashanti featuring Ja Rule)	Miranda	Frequency	3:35
14.	"Take a Break (Interlude)" (Illmind)	Miranda	Illmind	0:48
15.	"Say Yes to This" (Jill Scott)	Miranda; Scott; Aaron Pearce	Pearce	3:50
16.	"Congratulations" (Dessa)	Miranda	Andy Thompson; Lazerbeak^{[a]}	2:11
17.	"Burn" (Andra Day)	Miranda	Elizondo	3:39
18.	"Stay Alive (Interlude)" (J.Period and Stro Elliot)		J.Period; Elliot	0:33
19.	"Cabinet Battle 3 (Demo)" (Lin-Manuel Miranda)	Miranda; Tupac Shakur; Rufus Cooper III; Katari Cox; Yafeu Fula; Joseph Paquette; Bruce Washington, Jr.; Tyrone Wrice	Miranda	2:49
20.	"Washingtons by Your Side" (Wiz Khalifa)	Miranda; Cameron Thomaz; Eric Dan; Jeremy Kulousek; Zachary Vaughan	ID Labs	2:55
21.	"History Has Its Eyes on You" (John Legend)	Miranda	Legend	3:16
22.	"Who Tells Your Story" (The Roots featuring Common and Ingrid Michaelson)	Miranda; Trotter; Lonnie Lynn; Michaelson; Ibanga	Illmind	4:13
23.	"Dear Theodosia (Reprise)" (Chance the Rapper and Francis and the Lights)	Miranda	Francis and the Lights; Peter Cottontale; Nico Segal; Chance the Rapper	3:39

=== Notes ===
- ^{^[a]} signifies an additional producer.
- "Wrote My Way Out" features samples from the Hamilton (Original Broadway Cast Recording) recording "Hurricane".
- "An Open Letter Interlude" features interpolations from an original arrangement of the Hamilton song "The Adams Administration" from the Off-Broadway performance.
- "It's Quiet Uptown" features samples from the Hamilton (Original Broadway Cast Recording) recording "It's Quiet Uptown".
- "Immigrants (We Get the Job Done)" features samples from the Hamilton (Original Broadway Cast Recording) recording "Yorktown".
- "Take a Break (Interlude)" features samples from the Hamilton (Original Broadway Cast Recording) recording "Take a Break".
- "Say Yes to This" features samples from the Hamilton (Original Broadway Cast Recording) recording "Say No to This".
- "Stay Alive (Interlude)" features samples from the Hamilton (Original Broadway Cast Recording) recording "Stay Alive".
- "Who Tells Your Story" features samples from the Hamilton (Original Broadway Cast Recording) recording "Who Lives, Who Dies, Who Tells Your Story".
- "My Shot (Rise Up Remix)" contains elements of "Shook Ones Pt. II" written by Albert Johnson and Kejuan Waliek Muchita and "Going Back to Cali" written by Osteen Harvey Jr., Roger Troutman and Christopher Wallace.
- "Cabinet Battle 3 (Demo)" contains an interpolation of "Hail Mary" written by Tupac Shakur, Rufus Cooper III, Katari Cox, Yafeu Fula, Joseph Paquette, Bruce Washington Jr. and Tyrone Wrice.

== Hamildrops ==
In a tweet posted about a month before the Mixtape's release, Lin-Manuel Miranda implied that the album released on December 2 would only be the first volume, hinting at a Vol 2 to be released later. However, about a year later, Miranda admitted he was having trouble compiling a second album that satisfied him as much as the first mixtape, and cancelled the second volume, announcing that instead he would be releasing 13 tracks, once a month, over the following year. He referred to these releases as "Hamildrops."

=== Ben Franklin's Song ===
On December 14, 2017, the same day as announcing the Hamildrops, Miranda announced that the first release would be "Ben Franklin's Song" by The Decemberists. The song's lyrics are taken from lyrics to an unused Hamilton song that Miranda had written with the band in mind. The finished track had lyrics written by Miranda and music written by Decemberists frontman Colin Meloy. The song was released the following day, and was received warmly by fans and historians alike.

"Ben Franklin's Song" peaked at number 15 on the US Hot Rock Songs chart.

=== The Hamilton Polka ===
On March 2, 2018, (referred to as "February 30" by Miranda), a polka medley of songs from the musical recorded and arranged by "Weird Al" Yankovic was released. "The Hamilton Polka" peaked at number 1 on the US Comedy Digital Track Sales.

=== Found/Tonight ===
On March 19, 2018, Miranda released a mashup of the songs "Story of Tonight" from Hamilton and "You Will Be Found" from the musical Dear Evan Hansen, sung as a duet with Ben Platt. A portion of the proceeds are being donated in support of the March for Our Lives initiative. The following weekend, Miranda and Platt performed the song together along with frequent Miranda collaborator Alex Lacamoire (who had also orchestrated both shows) at the March for Our Lives rally in Washington, D.C., on March 24. "Found/Tonight" peaked at number 49 on the Billboard Hot 100 chart.

=== First Burn ===
On April 30, 2018, Miranda released a preliminary version of the song "Burn" performed by five singers who were currently playing or had previously played the role of Eliza; Arianna Afsar, Julia Harriman, Lexi Lawson, Rachelle Ann Go and Shoba Narayan. "First Burn" peaked at number 22 on the US Digital Song Sales chart.

=== Other announcements ===
On January 26, 2018, Miranda released a remix of "Wrote My Way Out" from Hamilton by Royce da 5'9", Joyner Lucas, & Black Thought featuring Aloe Blacc. A few days earlier, on the 19th, he released a music video on YouTube for the original version from the Mixtape.

On May 31, 2018, a cover of "Helpless" performed by The Regrettes was released.

On June 18, 2018, Miranda released "Boom Goes the Cannon...," a song written and performed by rap duo Mobb Deep. The release of this song was nearly a year after Mobb Deep member Prodigy died, with Miranda tweeting "Rest in peace, Prodigy. Thank you Havoc."

July's Hamildrops were delayed to the last week of August. The first one was "Rise Up Wise Up Eyes Up," a Hamilton-inspired piece by Ibeyi. The second was a YouTube music video of Andra Day's cover of Burn from the original soundtrack.

On September 20, 2018, Miranda released "A Forgotten Spot (Olvidado)" featuring Puerto Rican singers Zion & Lennox, De La Ghetto, Ivy Queen, PJ Sin Suela and Lucecita Benitez. The song peaked at number 13 on the US Latin Digital Song Sales chart.

On October 30, 2018, a cover of a deleted reprise of "Dear Theodosia" performed by Sara Bareilles was released.

"Cheering For Me Now", a new original song with music by Broadway composer John Kander and performed by Miranda, was released with an accompanying video on November 20, 2018.

On December 21, 2018, "One Last Time (44 Remix)" was released as the final Hamildrop. It is a remix of "One Last Time" featuring vocals from Original Broadway Cast Member Christopher Jackson, BeBe Winans, and 44th President of the United States Barack Obama. The remix peaked at number 38 on the Digital Song Sales chart and number 22 on the Hot R&B Songs chart.

== Charts ==
=== Weekly charts ===
Chart (2016)	Peak position
Australian Albums (ARIA)	26
Belgian Albums (Ultratop Flanders)	114
Canadian Albums (Billboard)	9
Hungarian Compilation Albums (MAHASZ)	6
New Zealand Albums (RMNZ)	29
US Billboard 200	1
US Top R&B/Hip-Hop Albums (Billboard)	1

=== Year-end charts ===
Chart (2017)	Position
US Billboard 200	100
US Top R&B/Hip-Hop Albums (Billboard)	41

== Certifications ==
Region	Certification	Certified units/sales
United States (RIAA)	Gold	500,000^{‡}
^{‡} Sales+streaming figures based on certification alone.

== Awards ==
Year	Award type	Category	Result
2017	MTV Video Music Awards	Best Fight Against the System (for "Immigrants (We Get the Job Done)")	Won
