= The World Was Wide Enough =

2015 song from the musical Hamilton

Song by Leslie Odom Jr., Lin-Manuel Miranda, and the original Broadway cast of Hamilton

from the album Hamilton
- Released: 2015
- Genre: Hip hop; Show tune
- Length: 5:02
- Songwriters: Lin-Manuel Miranda; Christopher E. Martin; Khary Kimani Turner

Audio
- "The World Was Wide Enough" on YouTube

"The World Was Wide Enough" is the penultimate song from Act 2 of the musical Hamilton, based on the life of Alexander Hamilton, which premiered on Broadway in 2015. Lin-Manuel Miranda wrote both the music and lyrics to the song. The song recounts the events of the 1804 duel in Weehawken, New Jersey between then–Vice President Aaron Burr and former Secretary of the Treasury Hamilton.

== Synopsis ==
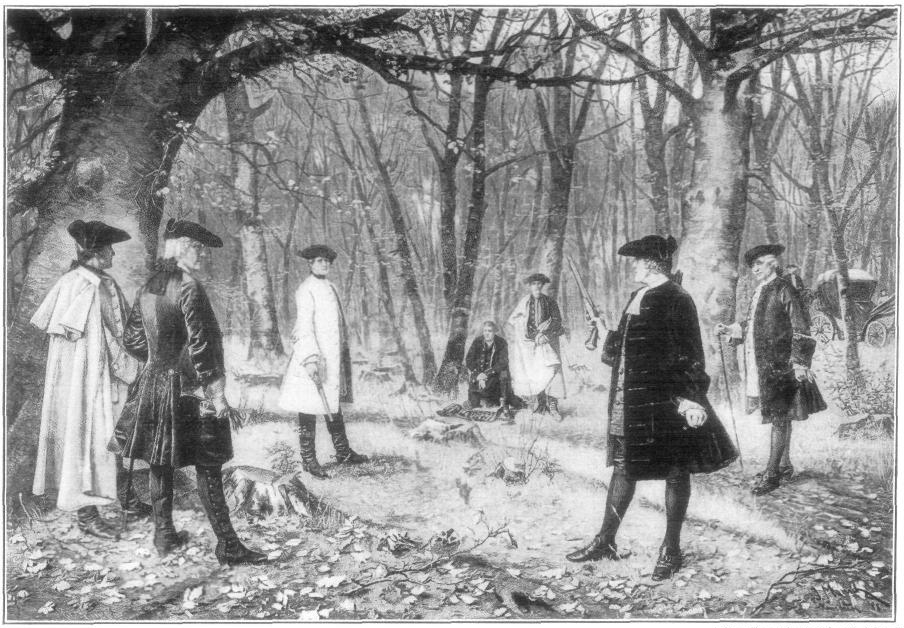
An artistic interpretation of the duel after painting "Ein Ehrenhandel" by Joseph Munsch (Austrian, 1832-1896)

The song begins in Burr's perspective. Burr states ten facts about the duel (particularly facts that made it clear that Hamilton had the advantage) as a reprise of "Ten Duel Commandments" plays, noting that the duel is taking place near the same spot where Hamilton's son Philip was killed in a duel.

As the duel draws nearer, Burr's tone becomes more and more frantic as he tries to justify why he has to shoot Hamilton to survive. Burr also states that he will not allow Hamilton to kill him because he does not want his daughter to become an orphan, and also because he is tired of waiting for his moment (reflecting Hamilton's own methodology from "My Shot").

He shoots at Hamilton. As the bullet approaches, time freezes and Hamilton breaks into a soliloquy, wondering if his death will be his legacy. He then realizes that a legacy by definition is something beyond one's control that no one lives to see, and finds peace by mentioning some of his deceased friends and family who await him "on the other side" before urging his wife Eliza to "take your time". With that said, in a mix of fear, confidence, and sadness, he throws away his shot by slowly aiming his pistol at the sky while saying "Raise a glass to freedom."

Time resumes as Burr, who was not expecting Hamilton to throw away his shot, shouts "wait!" as the bullet finally hits Hamilton. A devastated Burr then discusses the aftermath of the duel, in which he was ushered away from his opponent and told that he should probably hide, so he retreated to a bar for a drink. He informs the audience that Hamilton died not long after in the company of Eliza and her sister Angelica, then laments that he is now doomed to be the villain in Hamilton's history rather than being appraised on his own achievements. He then regretfully states that he should have "known the world was wide enough for both Hamilton and me."

According to the credits of the 2020 filmed version of Hamilton, this song contains elements of "Ten Crack Commandments" by The Notorious B.I.G., and the writers of that song also share in the writing credit of "The World Was Wide Enough".

== Analysis ==
The song takes its title and inspiration from a quote by Burr: "Had I read Sterne more and Voltaire less, I should have known the world was wide enough for both Hamilton and me." This was a reference to a scene in Sterne's Tristam Shandy. The character Uncle Toby tells a fly, "Go poor Devil, get thee gone, why should I hurt thee? This world is surely wide enough to hold thee and me."

It features reprises and leitmotifs from multiple other songs in the musical, including "My Shot", "The Story of Tonight", "Wait for It", "Ten Duel Commandments" and "One Last Time". It also marks the last time in which Hamilton speaks on stage. The song features a variety of musical styles, from the fast-paced and frenetic beginning to the slow, poetic ponderings of Hamilton prior to his death.

== Critical reception ==
The Young Folks had it ranked as the 16th best song in the musical.

Huffington Post praised the "poignant rumination on death and legacy", and said that the song was effective as it makes Burr complex and real, rather than a mere villain.

== Legacy ==
Democratic Presidential Candidate and former Secretary of State Hillary Clinton quoted from the song at the DNC during her 2016 Presidential Campaign, saying "Let our legacy be about 'planting seeds in a garden you never get to see'", a reference to Hamilton's soliloquy. Lin-Manuel Miranda responded positively on Twitter, stating "I'm with her".
