= Alexander Hamilton (song) =

2015 song from the musical Hamilton

Song by Leslie Odom Jr., Anthony Ramos, Daveed Diggs, Okieriete Onaodowan, Lin-Manuel Miranda, Phillipa Soo, Christopher Jackson, and the cast of Hamilton

from the album Hamilton
- Released: 2015
- Genre: Hip hop; show tune
- Length: 3:56
- Songwriter: Lin-Manuel Miranda

Audio
- "Alexander Hamilton" on YouTube

"Alexander Hamilton" is the opening number for the 2015 musical Hamilton, a musical biography of American Founding Father Alexander Hamilton, which premiered on Broadway in 2015. Lin-Manuel Miranda wrote both the music and lyrics to the song. This song features "alternately rapped and sung exposition".

== History ==
This song was originally part of a group of songs entitled "The Hamilton Mixtape" and created by Lin-Manuel Miranda as he started interpreting and adapting Ron Chernow's Hamilton biography for the stage. He performed this number live at a White House poetry jam in 2009. The National Review noted "The Obamas and the other guests react with more than a touch of surprise." The New Yorker writes that "Miranda later heard that the President's first reaction was to remark that [then-Secretary of the Treasury] Timothy Geithner had to see this." Miranda has stated that although this song was originally written as a monologue for Aaron Burr, as the project evolved from a mixtape into a musical, he felt it was important to bring the rest of the characters into the opening number, and references the prologue of Sweeney Todd in doing so: "All our characters set the stage for our main man's entrance."

The musical, and this song's YouTube video in particular, have influenced education; Miranda said "I think teachers used just that one clip for the past six years as their intro to Hamilton."

In February 2016, the song was performed live at the Grammys, the first time a song was broadcast live from a Broadway stage for the Hollywood award show. Billboard said they "wowed", while TVLine deemed it "crowd-pleasing". Billboard deemed it the night's fourth best live musical moment, writing "the emotional, enervating retelling of American history was one of the night's standout moments". Rolling Stone also deemed it a highlight and wrote "It's not Hamilton's most compelling set piece, but it's a very solid introduction to the show's characters, cast and themes. For millions that won't be able to make it to Broadway this year, watching it performed on network TV was the next best thing to actually scoring a ticket."

== Synopsis ==
This song is expository, setting up who the main character is and summarizing the first two decades of his life in a "bracingly economical synopsis of Hamilton's early years". It also introduces the other lead and supporting actors in the musical (who play Aaron Burr, John Laurens, Thomas Jefferson, James Madison, Elizabeth Schuyler Hamilton, George Washington, Hercules Mulligan, Marquis de Lafayette, Angelica Schuyler Church, Peggy Schuyler, and Maria Reynolds), who briefly describe their characters’ relationships to Hamilton. This "prologue" to the story, according to Patheos, "doesn't just bring Hamilton to life, but all of his contemporaries as well".

The derogatory terms used in the number to describe Hamilton, including "bastard", "orphan", "son of a whore and a Scotsman" are repeated throughout the musical in a motif that demonstrates how his upbringing would haunt him for the rest of his life, despite his attempt to escape his childhood misfortunes and climb to the top of the social ladder. This term was "derived from a contemptuous description by John Adams".

For over two centuries both Hamilton and Burr have been well known for their infamous duel, in which Burr fatally shot Hamilton. In the opening number, Burr himself acknowledges this, essentially giving away the ending. Thus, like the musical Titanic, the story becomes more about the journey than the destination.

== Analysis ==
The Atlantic notes that the musical's opening question "How does a bastard, orphan, son of a whore and a Scotsman, dropped in the middle of a forgotten spot in the Caribbean by providence, impoverished, in squalor grow up to be a hero and a scholar?" is answered throughout the following two acts, and essentially becomes "relentless labor", epitomised in Burr's rise to power, Hamilton's written documents, and Eliza's securing of Hamilton's legacy.

Uloop argues that Burr is actually Hamilton's main character, writing that in this opening number "Lin portrays his Burr as one completely knowing of his crime to come, in the style of Jesus Christ Superstar's Judas, and with the ferocity of Les Mis' Javert."

== Reception ==
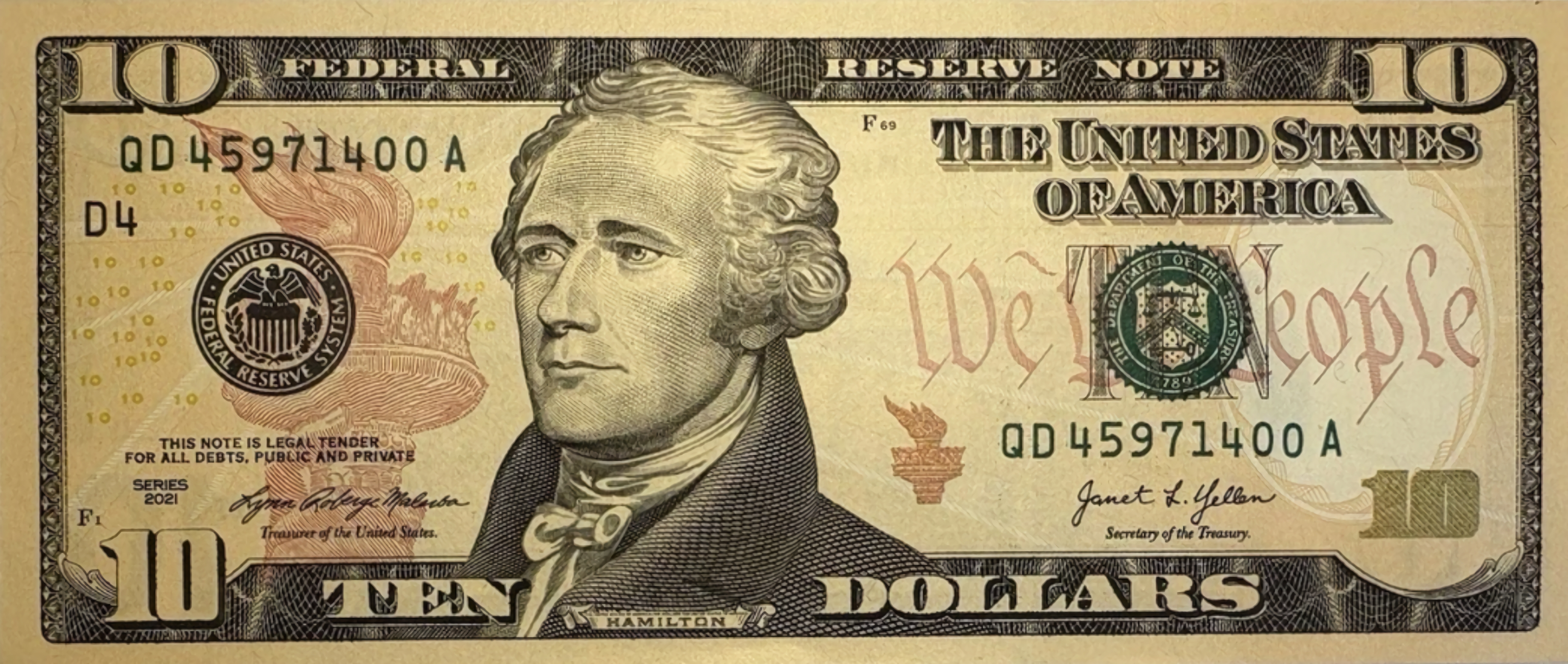
The US Treasury canceled plans to replace "the ten-dollar Founding Father" on the ten-dollar bill in part because fans of the Hamilton musical opposed the change.

The song has received critical acclaim. The Huffington Post argues that the song's wordplay and self-awareness elevates it above other opening numbers that rely on this "sung exposition" technique. Pitchfork explains that the song sets the musical tone by incorporating rap while being "still essentially in musical-theater territory". With Burr acting as the narrator of this number, the Los Angeles Times comments: "fitting, somehow, that the man who jealously slew Hamilton in a duel is the first to take up the mystery of his story". In an interview with Vulture, rapper Talib Kweli effusively praised the song as an exemplar of hip-hop, saying, "My heart swelled with pride after I heard this song, because I was like, 'This right here is hip-hop.' Hip-hop has no boundaries and no limits, and Lin-Manuel and his crew are proving it". Ricordia described it as "the anthem of a man that changed the world", and argued it should be the anthem of all listeners too. Hitfix notes that the song's opening stanzas "have this sort of great simple stripped down quality, just demonstrating how dense the rhyme schemes are, and conveying a lot of information, including a reminder that Hamilton is a face we see every day and rarely consider. Vibe wrote that the song has "booming instrumental, which features dramatic pauses and guitar strings".

== Charts ==
Chart (2020)	Peak position
US Rolling Stone Top 100	98

== Certifications ==
Region	Certification	Certified units/sales
New Zealand (RMNZ)	Platinum	30,000^{‡}
United Kingdom (BPI)	Gold	400,000^{‡}
United States (RIAA)	2× Platinum	2,000,000^{‡}
^{‡} Sales+streaming figures based on certification alone.

== See also ==
- Letter by Alexander Hamilton on the hurricane of August 1772, which is briefly referenced in the song
