= Non-Stop (Hamilton song) =

2015 song by the cast of Hamilton

Song by Leslie Odom Jr., Lin-Manuel Miranda, Renée Elise Goldsberry, Phillipa Soo, Christopher Jackson, and the cast of Hamilton

from the album Hamilton
- Released: 2015
- Genre: Hip hop; show tune
- Length: 6:25
- Songwriter: Lin-Manuel Miranda

Audio
- "Non-Stop" on YouTube

"Non-Stop" is the final song from Act 1 of the musical Hamilton, based on the life of Alexander Hamilton, which premiered on Broadway in 2015. Lin-Manuel Miranda wrote both the music and lyrics to the song.

== Synopsis ==
Following the end of the American Revolutionary War and the news of the tragic death of John Laurens at the hands of fleeing British soldiers after the war's conclusion, "Non-Stop" closes out the first act by recounting Hamilton's exceedingly busy and self-centered life. He co-authors the Federalist Papers and is selected by now-president George Washington to serve as the Secretary of the Treasury of the new nation. In the meantime, Angelica moves to London with her new husband, and Eliza begs Hamilton to stay with her to be a father to his son, but instead he buries himself in his work and begins to have friction with his former friends and loved ones including Eliza, Washington, and Aaron Burr.

== Analysis and reception ==
As the final song in Act 1 just ahead of intermission, "Non-Stop" wraps up many story threads while setting up Hamilton's character conflict leading into the political and personal turmoil of the second act.

Of all the songs in Hamilton, "Non-Stop" has been described by some as the best summation of Alexander Hamilton's character. One reviewer described the track's key success being tied to its relentlessness, mirroring Hamilton's own character. Other comparisons have included the song's "urgency and momentum" as the nation is built following the end of the war.

"Non-Stop" is notable for its culmination of various motifs established throughout the first act of the play, such as Angelica Schuyler's "Satisfied", George Washington's "History Has Its Eyes on You", Eliza Hamilton's "That Would Be Enough", and "Alexander Hamilton".

== Certifications ==
Region	Certification	Certified units/sales
United Kingdom (BPI)	Silver	200,000^{‡}
United States (RIAA)	Platinum	1,000,000^{‡}
^{‡} Sales+streaming figures based on certification alone.
