= Hamilton (album) =

Album of the stage musical Hamilton

Hamilton (Original Broadway Cast Recording)

Cast recording by the original Broadway cast of Hamilton
- Released: September 25, 2015
- Recorded: August 16–21, 2015
- Studios: Avatar (New York, New York); Invictus Sound, Long Island, NYC
- Genres: Show tunes; hip hop; R&B; soul
- Length: 142:13
- Label: Atlantic
- Producers: Alex Lacamoire; Bill Sherman; Lin-Manuel Miranda (also exec.); Ahmir Thompson (also exec.); Tariq Trotter (also exec.)

Hamilton (Original Broadway Cast Recording) is the cast album to the 2015 musical Hamilton. The musical is based on the 2004 biography of Alexander Hamilton written by Ron Chernow, with music, lyrics, and book by Lin-Manuel Miranda.

The recording features the original Broadway cast, which includes Miranda, Leslie Odom Jr., Phillipa Soo, Renée Elise Goldsberry, Christopher Jackson, Daveed Diggs, Anthony Ramos, Okieriete Onaodowan, Jasmine Cephas Jones, and Jonathan Groff, as well as ensemble members Jon Rua, Thayne Jasperson, Sydney James Harcourt, Ephraim Sykes, Ariana DeBose, and Sasha Hutchings.

The recording achieved the largest first week sales for a digital cast album and is the highest-charting cast album since 1969. It was the highest-selling Broadway cast album of 2015 and peaked at number one on the Rap Albums chart, the first cast album to ever do so. After being certified Diamond by the RIAA in 2023, Hamilton became the best-selling cast album of all time. In 2025, the album was deemed "culturally, historically, or aesthetically significant" by the Library of Congress and selected for preservation in the National Recording Registry.

== Commercial performance ==
The cast album for the musical premiered in September 2015 on NPR's website. Its digital release on September 25, 2015, debuted on numerous charts and was released in stores as a two-disc set on October 16, 2015. It debuted at number one on the Top Broadway Albums chart, as well as number 3 on Top Rap Albums. Hamilton's debut was the second-biggest first week sales of a Broadway cast album, just behind the cast album for the musical Rent. It debuted at number 12 on the overall Billboard 200 chart for sales, with over 2.1 million streams combined from digital service providers, the largest streaming debut for a cast album ever. Following the 70th Tony Awards in 2016, the album re-peaked at number 3 on the Billboard 200 chart, making it one of only three cast recordings to reach the top 10 in the last 50 years. Following the release of the live stage film of the Broadway production on July 3, 2020, the album reached the chart's second spot, a new peak. The July 2020 ranking made Hamilton the highest-charting cast album since Hair in 1969, an achievement coinciding with the album's 250th consecutive week on the Billboard 200.

The album was the highest-selling Broadway cast album of 2015 and peaked at number one on the Top Rap Albums chart, the first cast album to ever do so. It achieved the largest first week sales for a digital cast album and was the highest-charting cast album debut since 1963. It sold 169,000 copies in 2015, and a further 739,000 copies in 2016, making it the fifth best-selling album of 2016. It was certified 6x Multiplatinum by the RIAA on April 4, 2019, making it the best-selling cast recording of all time. That record was extended when the album was certified 7× platinum on September 16, 2020. As of July 2020 the album has sold 1.97 million pure copies. On June 26, 2023, it became the first cast album to receive a Diamond certification.

== Critical reception ==
Professional ratings
Aggregate scores
Source	Rating
Metacritic	85/100
Review scores
Source	Rating
AllMusic	5/5 stars
Billboard	5/5 stars
Pitchfork	6.9/10
Rolling Stone	4.5/5 stars
Vice	A

Hamilton was met with critical acclaim. Billboard called the album an "eye-popping debut", giving it a 5-out-of-5 star review and listing it at number 2 on the magazine's 50 Best Albums of 2015. Rolling Stone gave it a 4.5-out-of-5 star rating, listing it at number 8 on the magazine's Top 50 Albums of 2015. Robert Christgau wrote in Vice, "I can attest that the intrinsic intellectual interest [Lin-Manuel Miranda] powers up here is so impressive it's exciting".

== Track listing ==
All tracks are written by Lin-Manuel Miranda.

Act One
No.	Title	Performer(s)	Length
1.	"Alexander Hamilton"	Leslie Odom Jr.; Anthony Ramos; Daveed Diggs; Okieriete Onaodowan; Lin-Manuel Miranda; Phillipa Soo; Christopher Jackson; Original Broadway Cast of Hamilton	3:56
2.	"Aaron Burr, Sir"	Miranda; Odom Jr.; Ramos; Diggs; Onaodowan	2:36
3.	"My Shot"	Miranda; Ramos; Diggs; Onaodowan; Odom Jr.; Cast	5:33
4.	"The Story of Tonight"	Miranda; Ramos; Onaodowan; Diggs; Cast	1:31
5.	"The Schuyler Sisters"	Renée Elise Goldsberry; Soo; Jasmine Cephas-Jones; Odom Jr.; Cast	3:06
6.	"Farmer Refuted"	Thayne Jasperson; Miranda; Cast	1:52
7.	"You'll Be Back"	Jonathan Groff; Cast	3:28
8.	"Right Hand Man"	Jackson; Miranda; Odom Jr.; Cast	5:21
9.	"A Winter's Ball"	Odom Jr.; Miranda; Cast	1:09
10.	"Helpless"	Soo; Cast	4:09
11.	"Satisfied"	Goldsberry; Cast	5:29
12.	"The Story of Tonight (Reprise)"	Ramos; Onaodowan; Diggs; Miranda; Odom Jr.	1:55
13.	"Wait for It"	Odom Jr.; Cast	3:13
14.	"Stay Alive"	Cast	2:39
15.	"Ten Duel Commandments"	Ramos; Miranda; Jon Rua; Odom Jr.; Cast	1:46
16.	"Meet Me Inside"	Miranda; Odom Jr.; Ramos; Jackson; Cast	1:23
17.	"That Would Be Enough"	Soo; Miranda	2:58
18.	"Guns and Ships"	Odom Jr.; Diggs; Jackson; Cast	2:07
19.	"History Has Its Eyes On You"	Jackson; Miranda; Cast	1:37
20.	"Yorktown (The World Turned Upside Down)"	Cast	4:02
21.	"What Comes Next?"	Groff	1:39
22.	"Dear Theodosia"	Odom Jr.; Miranda	3:04
23.	"Non-Stop"	Odom Jr.; Miranda; Goldsberry; Soo; Jackson; Cast	6:25
Total length:			70:58

Act Two
No.	Title	Performer(s)	Length
1.	"What'd I Miss"	Diggs; Odom Jr.; Onaodowan; Cast	3:56
2.	"Cabinet Battle #1"	Jackson; Diggs; Miranda; Onaodowan	3:35
3.	"Take a Break"	Soo; Ramos; Miranda; Goldsberry	4:46
4.	"Say No to This"	Cephas-Jones; Odom Jr.; Miranda; Sydney James Harcourt; Cast	4:02
5.	"The Room Where It Happens"	Odom Jr.; Miranda; Diggs; Onaodowan; Cast	5:18
6.	"Schuyler Defeated"	Ramos; Soo; Miranda; Odom Jr.	1:03
7.	"Cabinet Battle #2"	Jackson; Diggs; Miranda; Onaodowan	2:22
8.	"Washington On Your Side"	Odom Jr.; Diggs; Onaodowan; Cast	3:01
9.	"One Last Time"	Jackson; Miranda; Cast	4:56
10.	"I Know Him"	Groff	1:37
11.	"The Adams Administration"	Cast	0:54
12.	"We Know"	Miranda; Diggs; Odom Jr.; Onaodowan	2:22
13.	"Hurricane"	Miranda; Cast	2:23
14.	"The Reynolds Pamphlet"	Cast	2:08
15.	"Burn"	Soo	3:45
16.	"Blow Us All Away"	Ramos; Ariana DeBose; Sasha Hutchings; Ephraim Sykes; Miranda; Cast	2:53
17.	"Stay Alive (Reprise)"	Miranda; Ramos; Soo; Cast	1:51
18.	"It's Quiet Uptown"	Goldsberry; Miranda; Soo; Cast	4:30
19.	"The Election of 1800"	Diggs; Onaodowan; Odom Jr.; Miranda; Cast	3:57
20.	"Your Obedient Servant"	Odom Jr.; Miranda; Cast	2:30
21.	"Best of Wives and Best of Women"	Soo; Miranda	0:47
22.	"The World Was Wide Enough"	Odom Jr.; Miranda; Cast	5:02
23.	"Who Lives, Who Dies, Who Tells Your Story"	Cast	3:37
Total length:			71:15 2:22:13

Interpolations

- "My Shot" contains elements of "Shook Ones Pt. II" written by Albert Johnson and Kejuan Waliek Muchita; "Going Back to Cali" written by Osteen Harvey Jr., Roger Troutman and Christopher Wallace; and "You've Got to Be Carefully Taught" from South Pacific, music by Richard Rodgers and lyrics by Oscar Hammerstein II.
- "Right Hand Man" contains elements of "The Modern Major General" from The Pirates of Penzance written by W. S. Gilbert and Arthur Sullivan.
- "Ten Duel Commandments" contains elements of "Ten Crack Commandments" written by Christopher E. Martin, Christopher Wallace, and Khary Kimani Turner.
- "Meet Me Inside" contains elements of "Party Up (Up in Here)" written by Kasseem Dean and Earl Simmons.
- "Cabinet Battle #1" contains elements of "The Message" written by Clifton Nathaniel Chase, Edward G. Fletcher, Melvin Glover, and Sylvia Robinson.
- "Say No to This" contains elements of "Nobody Needs to Know" from The Last Five Years, music and lyrics by Jason Robert Brown.
- "Cabinet Battle #2" contains elements of "Juicy (It's All Good)" written by Sean Combs, James Mtume, Jean-Claude Olivier, and Wallace.
- "Blow Us All Away" contains elements of "Ten Crack Commandments" written by Martin, Wallace, and Turner; and "Shook Ones Pt. II" written by Johnson and Muchita.
- "The World Was Wide Enough" contains elements of "Ten Crack Commandments" written by Martin, Wallace, and Turner.

Notes

- Lin-Manuel Miranda made a conscious decision to exclude one scene in the performance from the cast album, "Tomorrow There'll Be More of Us", also known as Laurens' Interlude.

== Personnel ==
Cast

- Lin-Manuel Miranda – Alexander Hamilton
- Phillipa Soo – Eliza Hamilton
- Leslie Odom Jr. – Aaron Burr
- Renée Elise Goldsberry – Angelica Schuyler
- Christopher Jackson – George Washington
- Daveed Diggs – Marquis de Lafayette / Thomas Jefferson
- Okieriete Onaodowan – Hercules Mulligan / James Madison
- Anthony Ramos – John Laurens / Philip Hamilton
- Jasmine Cephas Jones – Peggy Schuyler / Maria Reynolds
- Jonathan Groff – King George III
- Sydney James Harcourt – James Reynolds
- Thayne Jasperson – Samuel Seabury
- Jon Rua – Charles Lee
- Ephraim Sykes – George Eacker

Ensemble vocals

- Carleigh Bettiol
- Andrew Chappelle
- Ariana DeBose
- Alysha Deslorieux
- Sydney James Harcourt
- Neil Haskell
- Sasha Hutchings
- Thayne Jasperson
- Stephanie Klemons
- Morgan Marcell
- Javier Muñoz
- Emmy Raver-Lampman
- Jon Rua
- Austin Smith
- Seth Stewart
- Betsy Struxness
- Ephraim Sykes
- Voltaire Wade-Greene

Production

- Alex Lacamoire – production, orchestrations
- Bill Sherman – production
- Lin-Manuel Miranda – production, executive production
- Ahmir Thompson & Tariq Trotter for the Roots – production, executive production
- Craig Kallman – associate production
- Riggs Morales – associate production
- Sean Patrick Flahaven – associate production
- Thomas Kail – associate production
- Tyler Hartman – assistant engineering
- Ron Robinson – assistant engineering
- Ebonie Smith – assistant engineering
- Tom Coyne – mastering
- Michael Keller – music coordination
- Michael Aarons – music coordination
- Randy Cohen – synthesizer and drum programming
- Nevin Steinberg – Broadway sound effects
- Scott Wasserman – Ableton programming
- Taylor Williams – associate synthesizer programming
- Jeremy King – assistant synthesizer programming
- Will Wells – drum samples and additional loop editing
- Tim Latham – mixing
- Derik Lee – recording
- Emily Grishman – music copying
- Katharine Edmonds – music copying

Musicians

- Alex Lacamoire – conducting, keyboard 1
- Kurt Crowley – keyboard 2, associate music direction
- Jonathan Dinklage – concertmaster
- Erin Benim Mayland – violin
- Mario Gotoh – viola, violin
- Anja Wood – cello
- Andres Forero – drums
- Benny Reiner – percussion, keyboard
- Richard Hammond – bass, keyboard
- Robin Macatangay – guitars, banjos

Additional musicians for recording

- Laura Sherman – harp
- Ahmir "Questlove" Thompson – wood table on "Aaron Burr, Sir"

== Charts ==
=== Weekly charts ===
Weekly chart performance for Hamilton
Chart (2015–2020)	Peak position
Australian Albums (ARIA)	6
Belgian Albums (Ultratop Flanders)	136
Canadian Albums (Billboard)	2
Hungarian Albums (MAHASZ)	36
Irish Albums (IRMA)	52
New Zealand Albums (RMNZ)	7
UK Albums (Official Charts)	58
UK Compilation Albums (OCC)	1
UK Soundtrack Albums (Official Charts)	2
US Billboard 200	2
US Top Rap Albums (Billboard)	1
US Top Internet Albums (Billboard)	1

=== Year-end charts ===
Year-end chart performance for Hamilton
Chart (2015)	Position
US Cast Albums (Billboard)	1
Chart (2016)	Position
US Billboard 200	10
US Cast Albums (Billboard)	1
Chart (2017)	Position
US Billboard 200	9
US Cast Albums (Billboard)	1
US Top Rap Albums (Billboard)	5
Chart (2018)	Position
UK Albums (OCC)	89
US Billboard 200	21
US Cast Albums (Billboard)	1
US Top Rap Albums (Billboard)	14
Chart (2019)	Position
US Billboard 200	29
US Cast Albums (Billboard)	1
US Top Rap Albums (Billboard)	15
Chart (2020)	Position
Australian Albums (ARIA)	56
US Billboard 200	12
US Cast Albums (Billboard)	1
US Top Rap Albums (Billboard)	7
Chart (2021)	Position
Australian Albums (ARIA)	71
US Billboard 200	25
US Cast Albums (Billboard)	1
US Top Rap Albums (Billboard	9
Chart (2022)	Position
US Billboard 200	53
US Cast Albums (Billboard)	1
US Top Rap Albums (Billboard	17
Chart (2023)	Position
US Billboard 200	83
US Cast Albums (Billboard)	1
Chart (2024)	Position
US Billboard 200	84
Chart (2025)	Position
US Billboard 200	41

=== Decade-end charts ===
Decade-end chart performance for Hamilton
Chart (2010–2019)	Position
US Billboard 200	11

== Certifications ==
Certifications for Hamilton
Region	Certification	Certified units/sales
Australia (ARIA)	Platinum	70,000^{‡}
Denmark (IFPI Danmark)	2× Platinum	40,000^{‡}
New Zealand (RMNZ)	4× Platinum	60,000^{‡}
United Kingdom (BPI)	3× Platinum	900,000^{‡}
United States (RIAA)	Diamond	5,000,000^{‡}
^{‡} Sales+streaming figures based on certification alone.

=== Song certifications ===
List of songs, with selected chart positions and available certifications
Title	Certifications
"Aaron Burr, Sir"	RIAA: 2× Platinum; BPI: Silver
"Alexander Hamilton"	RIAA: 2× Platinum; BPI: Gold
"A Winter's Ball"	RIAA: Platinum; BPI: Silver
"Best of Wives and Best of Women"	RIAA: Gold
"Blow Us All Away"	RIAA: Gold
"Burn"	RIAA: Platinum; BPI: Gold
"Cabinet Battle #1"	RIAA: Platinum
"Cabinet Battle #2"	RIAA: Gold
"Dear Theodosia"	RIAA: Platinum; BPI: Silver
"Election of 1800"	RIAA: Gold
"Farmer Refuted"	RIAA: Gold; BPI: Silver
"Guns and Ships"	RIAA: Platinum; BPI: Gold
"Helpless"	RIAA: Platinum; BPI: Silver
"History Has Its Eyes On You"	RIAA: Platinum
"Hurricane"	RIAA: Gold
"I Know Him"	RIAA: Gold; BPI: Silver
"It's Quiet Uptown"	RIAA: Gold
"Meet Me Inside"	RIAA: Gold
"My Shot"	RIAA: 2× Platinum; BPI: Silver
"Non-Stop"	RIAA: Platinum; BPI: Silver
"One Last Time"	RIAA: Gold
"Right Hand Man"	RIAA: Gold; BPI: Silver
"Satisfied"	RIAA: 2× Platinum; BPI: Silver
"Say No to This"	RIAA: Platinum
"Schuyler Defeated"	RIAA: Gold
"Stay Alive"	RIAA: Platinum; BPI: Silver
"Take a Break"	RIAA: Platinum
"Ten Duel Commandments"	RIAA: Platinum
"That Would Be Enough"	RIAA: Platinum
"The Adams Administration"	RIAA: Gold
"The Reynolds Pamphlet"	RIAA: Gold
"The Room Where It Happens"	RIAA: Platinum; BPI: Silver
"The Schuyler Sisters"	RIAA: 2× Platinum
"The Story of Tonight"	RIAA: Platinum; BPI: Platinum
"The Story of Tonight (Reprise)"	RIAA: Platinum
"Wait For It"	RIAA: Platinum; BPI: Gold
"Washington on Your Side"	RIAA: Gold
"We Know"	RIAA: Gold
"What Comes Next?"	RIAA: Platinum
"What'd I Miss"	RIAA: Platinum
"Who Lives, Who Dies, Who Tells Your Story"	RIAA: Gold
"Yorktown (The World Turned Upside Down)"	RIAA: Platinum; BPI: Silver
"You'll Be Back"	RIAA: 2× Platinum; BPI: Gold
"Your Obedient Servant"	RIAA: Gold

== Awards ==
Year	Award type	Categories	Results
2016	Grammy Award	Best Musical Theater Album	Won
2016	NAACP Image Award	Outstanding Duo, Group, or Collaboration	Nominated
2017	Billboard Music Award	Billboard Music Award for Top Soundtrack/Cast Album	Won
