= The Story of Tonight =

Song in the musical "Hamilton"

Song by Lin-Manuel Miranda, Anthony Ramos, Okieriete Onaodowan, Daveed Diggs and the original Broadway cast of Hamilton

from the album Hamilton
- Released: 2015
- Genre: Show tune
- Length: 1:31
- Songwriter: Lin-Manuel Miranda

Audio
- "The Story of Tonight" on YouTube

"The Story of Tonight" is the fourth song from Act 1 of the musical Hamilton, based on the life of Alexander Hamilton, which premiered on Broadway in 2015. Lin-Manuel Miranda wrote both the music and lyrics to the song.

== Synopsis ==
The song recounts a meeting which occurred in 1776 between Alexander Hamilton, John Laurens, Hercules Mulligan and Marquis de Lafayette. In the song, the four young revolutionaries declare their loyalty and fealty to the newly-started American Revolutionary War, and consume alcohol in a bar as they talk, toasting every now and then. They state that their liberty and freedom can never be taken from them, and that there will soon be more people joining their cause. They also confess that they are willing to die in the fight, which Laurens eventually did.

== Reprises ==
The song has two reprises in the first act of the musical:

=== "The Story of Tonight (Reprise)" ===
"The Story of Tonight (Reprise)"

Song by Lin-Manuel Miranda, Anthony Ramos, Okieriete Onaodowan, Daveed Diggs, and Leslie Odom Jr.

from the album Hamilton
- Released: 2015
- Genre: Show tune
- Length: 1:55
- Songwriter: Lin-Manuel Miranda

Audio
- "The Story of Tonight (Reprise)" on YouTube

The first reprise of the song is the twelfth song in Act One of the musical. It takes place following the wedding of Alexander Hamilton and Elizabeth Schuyler in 1780. The group from the first rendition of the song is reunited, all of them drunk from the party and jokingly singing about the consequences of his marriage. They refer to Alexander as "the tomcat", referencing a moniker given to him by Martha Washington as a result of his promiscuous nature. Mulligan states that he is "newly not poor", as he has married into the wealthy Schuyler family. Their drunken festivities are interrupted by the arrival of Aaron Burr, who had recently been promoted to the rank of lieutenant colonel. Hamilton expresses envy at Burr's command, and Burr congratulates Hamilton on his nuptials, and Laurens inquires as to Burr's own romantic status. Hamilton dismisses his friends and Burr reveals that he is unlawfully consorting with the wife of a British officer. Hamilton asks Burr why he is so hesitant to be with this woman if he loves her, a question that leads Burr to reveal his world-view and philosophy in the next song, "Wait for It".

=== "Tomorrow There'll Be More of Us/Laurens' Interlude" ===
"Tomorrow There'll Be More of Us/Laurens' Interlude"

Song by Lin-Manuel Miranda, Anthony Ramos, and Phillipa Soo
- Genre: Show tune
- Songwriter: Lin-Manuel Miranda

A second reprise of "The Story of Tonight", titled "Tomorrow There'll Be More of Us/Laurens' Interlude" ("The Laurens Interlude" in the Off-Broadway version), occurs in the show near the end of Act One. Hamilton is working at home when his wife Eliza informs him that he has received a letter from South Carolina. Hamilton puts off reading the letter, believing it to be from John Laurens. However, Eliza reveals that the letter is actually from Laurens' father. At Hamilton's request, she reads the letter aloud, delivering the news of Laurens' death in the Battle of the Combahee River, and all the black soldiers that were with him had either been killed or captured and returned to their owners. This battle had occurred because the British troops in the southern territories had not yet received word that the war had ended, meaning that Laurens had died for no reason. In most stage productions, Lafayette and Mulligan are seen in the background as they read the same letter of their friend's death, though they don't speak or sing. Laurens' father laments that his son's dream of freedom for his people as well as his plans for the first "black battalion" have died with him. As the scene plays, a ghost-like Laurens appears and interjects lines from "The Story of Tonight", suggesting that he held on to the beliefs espoused in the song to the very end. Hamilton suppresses his emotional reaction to the news, saying only that he has "so much work to do," leading directly into "Non-Stop", the act's finale number.

The song was not included on the original Broadway cast recording. Miranda explained that it was "more of a scene than a song, the only scene in the [sung-through] show", and he wanted to reserve the impact of "at least one revelation" that could be experienced more fully onstage.

== Analysis ==
The song stylistically differs from many other songs in the musical due to the absence of hip-hop elements. Elizabeth Logan wrote that the song demonstrates the "characters' naïveté" as they are consumed with dreams of glory.

The song is referenced multiple times in the musical, most importantly in "The World Was Wide Enough", when, having been wounded in a duel in Weehawken, New Jersey, Hamilton's final words in his final soliloquy are "Raise a glass to freedom".

== Background ==
The melody to the song was originally written when Miranda was 16 for a song titled I've Got a Bridge to Sell You, with the titular line "I've got a bridge to sell you" being replaced with the current "no matter what they tell you" when the melody was repurposed for Hamilton. The song's use in Hamilton was inspired by Merrily We Roll Along's motif of "Here's to us. Who's like us? Damn few."

== Critical reception ==
The Young Folks considered the original song to be the musical's 28th best, and its first reprise to be the 44th.

== We the Kings version ==
We the Kings, an American rock band, recorded a cover version of "The Story of Tonight" which was released as a single in 2016.

== "Found/Tonight" ==
"Found/Tonight", a mashup charity single of "The Story of Tonight" with "You Will Be Found" from Dear Evan Hansen was released on March 19, 2018. It peaked at number 49 on the Billboard Hot 100.

== Other performances ==
The Tonight Show Starring Jimmy Fallon taped segments in Puerto Rico when Hamilton debuted on the island with the "And Peggy Tour" cast, including a performance of "The Story of Tonight", where Jimmy Fallon joined in as a second Alexander Hamilton next to Miranda singing about The Tonight Show and ending the performance with a salsa version of Fallon's Tonight Show opening song.

== Certifications ==
Region	Certification	Certified units/sales
New Zealand (RMNZ)	Gold	15,000^{‡}
United Kingdom (BPI)	Platinum	600,000^{‡}
United States (RIAA)	Platinum	1,000,000^{‡}
^{‡} Sales+streaming figures based on certification alone.
