= You'll Be Back =

Song from the musical Hamilton

Song by Jonathan Groff and the original Broadway cast of Hamilton

from the album Hamilton
- Released: 2015
- Genre: Show tune
- Length: 3:29
- Songwriter: Lin-Manuel Miranda

Audio
- "You'll Be Back" on YouTube

"You'll Be Back" is the seventh song from Act 1 of the musical Hamilton, based on the life of Alexander Hamilton, which premiered on Broadway in 2015. Lin-Manuel Miranda wrote both the music and lyrics to the song. It is sung by Jonathan Groff in the show's original cast recording. Within the context of the musical, it is King George III lamenting the anti-royal machinations of the rebelling American colonists. It covers a vocal range of D3 to A4 (not counting a falsetto riff up to C5) and is written for a tenor voice.

== History ==
In the book Hamilton: The Revolution, Miranda says that he went for a drink with Hugh Laurie after filming their 2009 episodes of Laurie's series House, in which Miranda guest starred. "I told him I wanted to write a breakup letter from King George to the colonies," Miranda writes. "Without blinking, he improv'd at me, 'Awwww, you'll be back,' wagging his finger. I laughed and filed it away. Thanks, Hugh Laurie."

The song was featured in a 2016 Ham4Ham clip in which Jimmy Fallon sang the song through various musical impersonations. Fallon covered it once again as a part of The Hamilton Mixtape.

The song was covered by Callum Howells in a 2017 episode of Let It Shine, airing on BBC One.

The song briefly appears as an Easter egg in a scene from the film adaptation of Miranda's earlier musical In the Heights, where it is used as hold music for a phone call.

== Synopsis ==
King George III is dismayed by the American War of Independence and expresses his belief that the American Colonists will crawl back to the British Empire once their rebellion is quashed.

The melody is reprised twice in the play for King George's other two numbers: "What Comes Next?", in which the king ultimately refuses to help the recently freed United States if it struggles with its independent leadership; and "I Know Him", in which the king seems concerned that John Adams will not be as effective a president as George Washington was, before expressing disdainful amusement at the thought of the United States becoming divided over Adams' leadership.

== Style ==
While the majority of songs in the musical Hamilton are in the genre of hip-hop, R&B, or soul, this one is described by Vibe as being in the style of the Beatles. Vulture described it as "a Carnaby Street breakup song not unlike 'With a Little Help from My Friends'", and The New York Times deemed it "chiming '60s Britpop". In other words, the song is a reference to the British Invasion of the 1960s.

The song's lyrics anticipate the imminent British invasion of New York City covered in the next song, "Right Hand Man".

== Critical reception ==
Vibe deemed it a "sunny, playful take on the airing of grievances". The Hollywood Reporter wrote that the "melodically rich number" has "sardonic humor". The Daily Review wrote that any Australian thinking about the possibility of a republic will thoroughly enjoy King George's "bemoaning" of the revolutionary war. The New York Times deemed it "sneering yet wonderfully breezy". The American Conservative praised it as a "brilliant... creepy stalker ballad".

Alexander Hamilton biographer Ron Chernow said, "I can remember laughing uproariously when [Lin] first sent me King George III's satirical song to the colonists, 'You'll Be Back.'"

== Charts ==
Chart (2020)	Peak position
US Digital Song Sales (Billboard)	21
US Rolling Stone Top 100	93

== Certifications ==
Region	Certification	Certified units/sales
United Kingdom (BPI)	Platinum	600,000^{‡}
United States (RIAA)	2× Platinum	2,000,000^{‡}
^{‡} Sales+streaming figures based on certification alone.
