= Dear Theodosia =

Song by Leslie Odom Jr., Lin-Manuel Miranda, and the cast of Hamilton

from the album Hamilton
- Released: 2015
- Genre: Show tune
- Length: 3:05
- Songwriter: Lin-Manuel Miranda

Audio
- "Dear Theodosia" on YouTube

"Dear Theodosia" is the penultimate song from Act 1 of the musical Hamilton, based on the life of Alexander Hamilton, which premiered on Broadway in 2015. Lin-Manuel Miranda wrote both the music and lyrics to the song. The song is sung by the character Aaron Burr, originally performed by Leslie Odom Jr., and Hamilton, originally performed by Miranda.

== History ==
Miranda wrote this song during a week spent in the Dominican Republic, while they were visiting his wife Vanessa Nadal's family, as they dreaded the passing of her aunt, who was battling ALS. During this week, the couple met a small dog that they eventually adopted and named Tobillo ("ankle" in Spanish), and Nadal's aunt died. Miranda has written that this song is "the calm in the storm of our show, and it was the calm in the storm of my life in that moment."

The song was originally written with a second verse that featured Burr and Hamilton singing overlapping verses, but the song was shortened for time. Miranda and Odom performed the original, extended version for the first time at the "Broadway for Biden" fundraising event on September 18, 2023.

== Synopsis ==
The song is sung by Aaron Burr and Alexander Hamilton. They welcome their respective children, Theodosia and Philip, into the world. The men proclaim that they will fight to make the world better for their children. They vow to give their children a better childhood than their own. The Hollywood Reporter acknowledges the coincidence reflected within the song, in which "two orphaned men...contemplate the rewards of fatherhood." Vibe added that this "fatherly ballad...gives the dads a chance to reflect on their childhoods whilst contemplating how to be better with their own kids".

== Analysis ==
The "parenthood song" has a lyrical reference to "Blow Us All Away", in the metaphorical sense of overwhelmingly impressing their parents by their future successes. However, The Huffington Post notes that this motif returns later in the musical when young Phillip receives a deadly gunshot wound in a duel.

== Critical reception ==
David Rooney of The Hollywood Reporter praised "Dear Theodosia" for being a "heartbreaker". Chris Bodenner of The Atlantic declared the song the "track of the day" on January 3, 2016, due to a recommendation by a reader who said "I love the way this song tenderly expresses the humbling experience of parenthood shared by two men—both quite roughened to the ways of the world and otherwise vehemently opposed. The common ground of our humanity."

== Certifications ==
Certifications for "Dear Theodosia"
Region	Certification	Certified units/sales
New Zealand (RMNZ)	Gold	15,000^{‡}
United Kingdom (BPI)	Silver	200,000^{‡}
United States (RIAA)	Platinum	1,000,000^{‡}
^{‡} Sales+streaming figures based on certification alone.

== Covers ==
"Dear Theodosia" also appears twice on The Hamilton Mixtape, first sung by Regina Spektor featuring Ben Folds, and another version sung by Chance the Rapper and Francis and the Lights. Spektor and Folds' version peaked at number 38 on the Hot Rock Songs chart, and was performed live as a part of National Symphony Orchestra’s DECLASSIFIED: Ben Folds Presents series.

On December 30, 2018, a cut reprise of the song covered by Sara Bareilles was released as part of the "Hamildrop" project.
