= Right Hand Man (Hamilton song) =

Song from the 2015 musical Hamilton

Song by Christoper Jackson, Lin-Manuel Miranda, Leslie Odom Jr. and the original Broadway cast of Hamilton

from the album Hamilton
- Released: 2015
- Genre: Hip hop; show tune
- Length: 5:21
- Songwriter: Lin-Manuel Miranda

Audio
- "Right Hand Man" on YouTube

"Right Hand Man" is the eighth song from Act 1 of the musical Hamilton, based on the life of Alexander Hamilton, which premiered on Broadway in 2015. Lin-Manuel Miranda wrote both the music and lyrics to the song. The song introduces then-General George Washington to the musical, and culminates with Hamilton becoming his eponymous "right-hand man".

== Synopsis ==
At the very beginning of the American Revolutionary War, Alexander Hamilton reiterates his desire (as laid out in "My Shot") to fight in a war in order to rise up from his poor childhood. Aiming to be promoted to a position of command in the Continental Army, Hamilton hopes to get the attention of General George Washington, who had been appointed commander-in-chief at the Second Continental Congress. Aaron Burr then introduces Washington, who discusses his frustration with his forces in the fight for control of New York City. Hamilton attempts to reverse the tide of the battle by capturing British cannons that were attacking his unit in the Battery. These actions bring Hamilton to the attention of Washington, who decides to recruit an aide-de-camp after retreating from Brooklyn. Burr applies for this role, but is dismissed in favor of Hamilton, who reluctantly accepts the eponymous role at the song's conclusion.

The song contains the lyric, "Now I'm the model of a modern major general", which is adapted from the Major-General's Song from The Pirates of Penzance by Gilbert and Sullivan. The credits of the 2020 film adaptation of Hamilton acknowledge this as the source of the lyric.

== Analysis ==
The song serves to introduce George Washington, a role originated on Broadway by Christopher Jackson.

Elizabeth Logan, writing for Huffington Post, considered the song to incorporate recurring motifs from the musical, such as "throwing away my shot" - a reference to My Shot. It further sows seeds of discord between Hamilton and Burr due to jealousy, and this becomes important in Act 2 of the musical, where the two duel in Weehawken, New Jersey.

The song receives a reprise later in the musical, when Washington asks Hamilton to assume the role of Secretary of the Treasury in the Cabinet of the United States.

== Critical reception ==
BuzzFeed ranked the song as the 22nd best in the musical, while The Young Folks had it ranked 19th.

Vibe.com said that it marked a return to the initial "1990's feel" of the musical.

== Certifications ==
Region	Certification	Certified units/sales
United Kingdom (BPI)	Silver	200,000^{‡}
United States (RIAA)	Gold	500,000^{‡}
^{‡} Sales+streaming figures based on certification alone.
