= Satisfied (Hamilton song) =

Song in the musical "Hamilton"

Song by Renée Elise Goldsberry and the cast of Hamilton

from the album Hamilton
- Released: September 25, 2015
- Recorded: 2015
- Genre: R&B; show tune
- Length: 5:30
- Label: Atlantic
- Songwriter: Lin-Manuel Miranda

Audio
- "Satisfied" on YouTube

"Satisfied" is the eleventh song from Act 1 of the musical Hamilton, based on the life of Alexander Hamilton, which premiered on Broadway in 2015. Lin-Manuel Miranda wrote both the music and lyrics to the song. The song is sung by the character Angelica Schuyler, originally performed by Renée Elise Goldsberry. Goldsberry released a solo version of the song for her 2025 album, Who I Really Am. The official music video for her solo version was released on YouTube in 2026.

== Background ==
On Twitter, Lin-Manuel Miranda posted a real letter from Angelica to Alexander Hamilton that inspired the song's lyrics: "You are happy my dear friend to find consolation in 'words & thoughts.' I cannot be so easily satisfied." Miranda told The Hollywood Reporter, "The lyrics...are some of the most intricate I've ever written. I can't even rap them, but Renée Elise Goldsberry, who plays Angelica — that's her conversational speed. That's how fast she thinks. You really get the sense that Angelica's the smartest person in the room, and she reads Hamilton within a moment of meeting him."

== Synopsis ==
"Satisfied" begins with Angelica Schuyler's wedding toast for Alexander Hamilton and Eliza (her sister), then proceeds to rewind and retell the events of the previous song, "Helpless," from her own perspective. She, who in "The Schuyler Sisters" had declared was looking for a "mind at work", has now found it in Hamilton yet is forced to give it up for the sake of her sister who she ‘Knows like Angelica's own mind’. On Stage explains: "in a truly inspired piece of staging that literally made my jaw drop, the scene rewinds around Angelica before your eyes, taking us back to the beginning of 'Helpless'—except now we're seeing that fateful first meeting of the Schuyler sisters and Hamilton from Angelica's point of view."

== Style ==
The song has "tongue-twister lyrics" and sees "Angelica Schuyler rapping as fast as Busta Rhymes." Rolling Stone said the song sees Angelica "dipping in and out of Nicki Minaj-style rhymes and Bernadette Peters vocal runs." OnStage wrote that the song has a "rhythm reminiscent of "Superbass" by Nicki Minaj.

== Analysis ==
The Los Angeles Times observes that "Angelica sheds darker light on the partly transactional nature of marriage, with hearts going one way, heads another." Patheos notes that "Helpless" and "Satisfied" show the two different ways that Eliza and Angelica see the same person.

== Critical reception ==
The Huffington Post wrote "It's heartbreaking all around." Vibe wrote, "'Satisfied' is a love song perfect for today's FM rotation with its contemporary feel and lyrical content." Music Mic wrote that "Satisfied" is one of the most popular songs from the musical. The Atlantic deemed the song "epic" due to "bracket[ing] songs within songs, speeding up and slowing down time as Angelica airs her regrets". The Rolling Stone said the "heartbreaking" song "might be Miranda's finest moment". Entertainment Monthly said "'Satisfied' is one of the strongest tracks on the album", adding that "Goldsberry's rapping mixed with her Broadway vocals creates a heavenly combination." The New Yorker wrote that the song "has knocked me senseless each time I've seen it, both because of Miranda's cunning construction and because of Goldsberry's motormouthed delivery." The New Yorker further deemed the song the biggest showstopper of 2015, writing that it "may be the single best theatrical song written in the past decade."

== Certifications ==
Certifications for "Satisfied"
Region	Certification	Certified units/sales
United Kingdom (BPI)	Platinum	600,000^{‡}
United States (RIAA)	2× Platinum	2,000,000^{‡}
^{‡} Sales+streaming figures based on certification alone.

== Mixtape version ==
"Satisfied"

Promotional single by Sia featuring Miguel and Queen Latifah

from the album The Hamilton Mixtape
- Released: November 11, 2016
- Recorded: 2016
- Studio: Can Am (Tarzana); The Rib Cage (Los Angeles); Art Dealer Chic (Los Angeles); Glenwood Place (Burbank)
- Genre: R&B
- Length: 5:18
- Label: Atlantic
- Songwriter: Lin-Manuel Miranda
- Producer: Mike Elizondo

Sia promotional singles chronology
"Unforgettable" (2016)	"Satisfied" (2016)	"Fly Me to the Moon" (2021)

A cover of "Satisfied" is featured on The Hamilton Mixtape, performed by Sia featuring Miguel and Queen Latifah.

=== Charts ===
Chart (2016)	Peak position
Canada (Hot Canadian Digital Songs)	35
US Bubbling Under Hot 100 (Billboard)	14
