= Cato (spy) =

American spy during the American Revolution

Cato Howe
- Occupations: Spy, courier
- Espionage activity
- Allegiance: United States
- Service branch: Continental Army, American Revolutionary War
- Service years: 8 years
- Rank: Enslaved person and a spy

Cato was an enslaved African American Black Patriot spy and courier operating out of British-occupied New York City during the American Revolution. Cato's enslaver, Hercules Mulligan, gathered intelligence through his connections as well as clients at his tailoring shop. Cato carried the information to Continental Army officers and other revolutionaries, including Alexander Hamilton and George Washington, often crossing the Hudson River into New Jersey. Cato's messages are credited with saving Washington's life on at least two occasions. After the war, Cato was granted his freedom in return for his service and moved to Plymouth, Massachusetts.

Besides his intelligence activities with Mulligan, little definite information about Cato is available.

== American Revolution ==
Because no correspondence with Mulligan's name or a recognized alias on it survives, a complete record of his and Cato's activities during the American Revolution cannot be compiled. An article in the Daughters of the American Revolution Magazine in 1985 stated: "Every estimate of the number of minorities who participated in the American Revolution has been deceptively low...." Cato is among those whose contributions have been mostly overlooked. Historian Paul R. Misencik has written that Cato was a "faithful accomplice" of Mulligan's.

=== Culper Ring ===
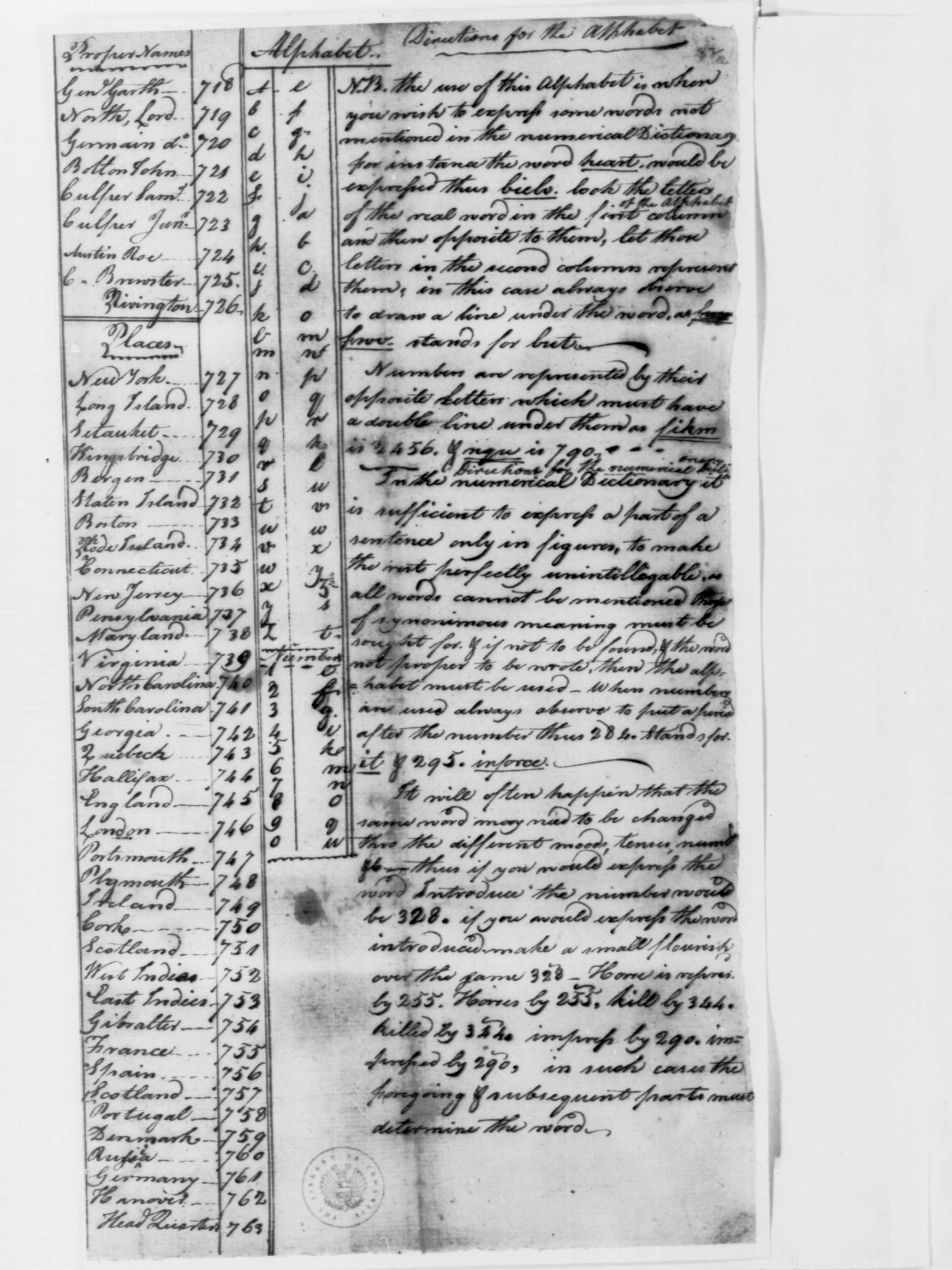
A page from the code book of the Culper Spy Ring during the American Revolutionary War.

While Cato and Mulligan operated mostly simultaneously with Washington and Benjamin Tallmadge's Culper Ring of American spies, their official affiliation with the group is disputed. Although historian Alexander Rose has written that Mulligan and Cato began espionage activities within six weeks of Robert Townsend, alias "Samuel Culper, Jr.", sending his first intelligence letter, historian Stephen Knott writes that they began spying in late 1776 or early 1777, well before formation of the Culper Ring in 1778 and mostly independent of it.

=== Hessian plot ===
Cato facilitated a plot between Mulligan and Haym Salomon, a Patriot loyalist who had been released from British captivity under the condition that he work as a translator between the British and Hessian soldiers. The plot involved collecting intelligence from and advertising Mulligan's tailoring business to the Hessian officers. Mulligan sent Cato to Salomon's shop with ads to translate into German and pass to the Hessians, and Cato returned with the translations and intelligence that Mulligan could report to Hamilton and Washington at Continental Army headquarters.

=== British troop movements ===
Since the British did not suspect an enslaved person would be acting as a messenger to George Washington, in April 1777, they allowed Cato to cross the Hudson River on a ferry, carrying packages of tailored clothing from Mulligan within which were hidden intelligence about British General William Howe's activities and movements. Many of the British soldiers were Mulligan's customers and, therefore, knew Cato and let him both pass to New Jersey and return to New York with the packages marked "H. Mulligan, clothier."

After the British abandoned Philadelphia and returned to New York City in the summer of 1778, activity again picked up in the restored British Army headquarters. William Cunningham, an Irish Tory who was serving as Provost Marshal of New York City, suspected Mulligan of espionage and was curious about Cato's trips from New York. He eventually questioned and jailed Cato, treating him cruelly and interrogating him about Mulligan's activities and his deliveries out of town. Cato would not talk.

=== Attempts on Washington ===
During the winter of 1779, a British officer came into Mulligan's New York tailor shop late in the evening looking for a watch coat. During the conversation, the officer shared a British plan to attack and capture Washington the following day. Cato was quickly dispatched to alert Washington, who moved his troops and thwarted the attack.

In 1780, Mulligan received intelligence from his brother Hugh, who worked for British army contractor Kortright and Company, that the British planned to intercept Washington in New London, Connecticut on his way to meet with General Rochambeau. Cato carried the message to Washington, who rerouted in such a way to distract the British from the French landing in Newport, Rhode Island.

=== Later life ===
In 1778, Cato was granted his freedom in return for his service during the war. He was discharged in 1783 and moved to Plymouth, Massachusetts.

== In popular culture ==
The Culper Ring is depicted in the fictionalized AMC American Revolutionary War period drama Turn: Washington's Spies based on Alexander Rose's book Washington's Spies: The Story of America's First Spy Ring (2007). Mulligan and Cato are portrayed in the fourth and final season.

== See also ==
- Culper Ring
- Intelligence in the American Revolutionary War
- Intelligence operations in the American Revolutionary War
- Hercules Mulligan
