= Helpless (Hamilton song) =

Song by Phillipa Soo and the cast of Hamilton

from the album Hamilton
- Released: 2015
- Genre: R&B; soul; show tune
- Length: 4:10
- Songwriter: Lin-Manuel Miranda

Audio
- "Helpless" on YouTube

"Helpless" is the tenth song from Act 1 of the musical Hamilton, based on the life of Alexander Hamilton, which premiered on Broadway in 2015. Lin-Manuel Miranda wrote both the music and lyrics to the song.

== Synopsis ==
This song focuses on the romance and eventual wedding of Eliza Schuyler and Alexander Hamilton. Eliza is introduced to Hamilton by her sister Angelica during a ball held while the Army is stationed in Morristown for the winter in early 1780. They immediately start a correspondence, and Hamilton wastes no time in asking Eliza's father, Philip Schuyler, for his permission to marry his daughter, which is granted. Hamilton shares with Eliza his concerns regarding his orphanhood and lack of wealth and station, but Eliza dismisses them. The song ends on the notes of the Bridal Chorus played at their wedding.

=== Historical differences ===
Although the musical Hamilton is based on true events, Miranda uses dramatic license in retelling the story. Here, the main differences are:

- Eliza was alone in Morristown when she first met Hamilton in early February 1780, a guest of her paternal aunt Gertrude and Gertrude's husband, Dr. John Cochran.
- Angelica had eloped with John Barker Church three years before she first met Hamilton at her sister's wedding in December 1780, when she was already the mother of two of her eight children with Church.

== Style ==
The Huffington Post described the song as "equal parts Cole Porter and Ja Rule, a sweet pop/R&B tune." Phillipa Soo said that inspirations for the song include Beyoncé, Alicia Keys, and Etta James. Musical director Alex Lacamoire explained, "The Beyoncé reference is 'Stressin'! Blessin'!' sounds like 'Houston rocket!' [in "Countdown"]. We asked the girls to deliver it like that." Slate said the "big R&B love song" drew inspiration from Beyoncé's "Countdown" due to its "half-rapped, half-sung cadences," and added that the lyrics "the boy is mine" is a lyrical reference to the song of the same name by Brandy and Monica. According to NPR, the song also includes a hip hop reference in the form of a lyrical nod to Trina and Mannie Fresh's song "Da Club." GCAdvocate notes that in "Satisfied," Eliza's "assertive, clever sister Angelica Schuyler raps and remixes "Helpless." The LA Times said the song had "the flair of Destiny's Child." The Man Eater also likens Eliza's vocal stylings to "the style of Beyoncé."

== Critical reception ==
GCAdvocate was impressed that "Soo's repetitive 'I do's in the pop song foreshadow their wedding" which occurs at the end of the song. The Hollywood Reporter wrote that "'Helpless' measures up to the most irresistible pop songs about love at first sight in the way it captures the sheer giddiness and joy of a romantic thunderbolt." The Washington Post said the song was "a divinely refined girl group treatment of Hamilton's courtship of Eliza." The American Conservative said the song is "a gorgeous song where helplessness is a child's terror but also a lover's rapture."

== Mixtape version ==
"Helpless" is performed on The Hamilton Mixtape by Ashanti and Ja Rule, both of whom Miranda cites as inspirations for the composition of the song. "Ashanti and Ja Rule were in my head when I was writing 'Helpless,'" Miranda told Entertainment Weekly. "It has the structure of an Ashanti-Ja Rule song: two verses, two choruses, a guest rap feature, then back to the chorus and around." Regarding getting Ashanti and Ja Rule to perform the song for the mixtape, producer Ahmir "Questlove" Thompson told the magazine:

"When it came down to figuring out these songs [on the Mixtape], I was just like, 'Dude, this is the white elephant in the room: Are you guys really not gonna go after Ja Rule and Ashanti?' You wrote it for them. You might as well just have them do it.'" When they agreed, Thompson says, "I was happy as hell."

Another version by The Regrettes was released on May 31, 2018.

== Certifications ==
Certifications for "Helpless"
Region	Certification	Certified units/sales
United Kingdom (BPI)	Gold	400,000^{‡}
United States (RIAA)	Platinum	1,000,000^{‡}
^{‡} Sales+streaming figures based on certification alone.
