= Cabinet Battle =

Songs from the musical "Hamilton"

"Cabinet Battle #1" & "Cabinet Battle #2" are songs written for Act II of the musical Hamilton, based on the life of Alexander Hamilton, which premiered on Broadway in 2015. Lin-Manuel Miranda wrote both the music and lyrics to the songs.

The songs portray discussions in the cabinet of the administration of George Washington (played by Christopher Jackson in the original cast) in the style of rap battles between Secretary of the Treasury Alexander Hamilton (Lin-Manuel Miranda) and U.S. Secretary of State Thomas Jefferson (Daveed Diggs), with U.S. Representative James Madison (Okieriete Onaodowan) occasionally assisting Jefferson. The Cabinet Battles, which include the anachronistic use of microphones, were influenced by the rap battles that appear in the film 8 Mile.

"Cabinet Battle #1" and "Cabinet Battle #2" were performed in the stage version of the musical. "Cabinet Battle #3" was cut from the final version, but Lin-Manuel Miranda's demo track of that song was ultimately released on The Hamilton Mixtape.

According to the credits of the 2020 filmed version of Hamilton, "Cabinet Battle #1" contains elements of "The Message" by Grandmaster Flash and the Furious Five, while "Cabinet Battle #2" contains elements of "(It's All Good)" by The Notorious B.I.G. The songwriters of those songs officially share credit on these songs, also per the credits of the film.

== Cabinet Battle #1 ==
"Cabinet Battle #1"

Song by Christopher Jackson, Daveed Diggs, Lin-Manuel Miranda, Okieriete Onaodowan, & the Cast of Hamilton

from the album Hamilton
- Released: 2015
- Genre: Hip hop; show tune
- Length: 3:36
- Songwriters: Lin-Manuel Miranda; Clifton Nathaniel Chase; Edward G. Fletcher; Melvin Glover; Sylvia Robinson

Audio
- "Cabinet Battle #1" on YouTube

"Cabinet Battle #1" is the second song from Act II of the musical Hamilton. George Washington begins the song by explaining the issue before them: whether or not to adopt Hamilton's proposal of assuming state's debts and establishing a national bank.

=== Jefferson's verse ===
Jefferson starts the rap battle by quoting his Declaration of Independence. Jefferson, an avid supporter of state government and individual rights, quotes himself to emphasize those values that he holds dear. Jefferson's philosophies thus opposed Hamilton's First Report on the Public Credit because the report analyzed the financial standing of the United States of America and made recommendations to reorganize the national debt and to establish the public credit. Creating national public credit would increase the power of the federal government, something unprecedented in early American history. Also, Virginia, the state of Jefferson's home and estate Monticello, had already paid off its debts, as well as most of the Southern states. Further attacking Hamilton's financial plan, Jefferson raps about the length of the plan, a 40,000 word document, New York politicians such as Hamilton who gained wealth through moving the finances of the actual product producing southern states, and even attacking Hamilton as a greedy man who should not be a politician who gains popularity. As he closes, Jefferson references the British Intolerable Acts and the Boston Tea Party to highlight his foreshadowing of the Whiskey Rebellion. As part of Hamilton's Report, a tax on whiskey became law in 1791, and was intended to generate revenue to help reduce the national debt.

=== Hamilton's verse ===
Hamilton begins his rebuttal by accusing Jefferson of being out of touch with the American public, due to his time in France and at his plantation in Monticello, Virginia.

Another aspect of Hamilton's attack on Jefferson's person and morals are his slaves. In 1774, the earliest record, it was recorded that Jefferson owned at least 41 slaves. Hamilton makes light of Jefferson's dealing with President George Washington and the discord between the two.

=== Washington's decision ===
Though Washington likes Hamilton's idea, Hamilton is unable to sway enough others to get the votes he needs. He is thus unable to get his proposal passed, a fact for which Jefferson and Madison mock him. Washington takes Hamilton aside and orders him to work out a compromise that will get his motion passed, hinting that Hamilton may be forced out of office if he can't manage it. This is resolved in "The Room where it Happens" in which Hamilton negotiates a compromise with Jefferson and Madison: in exchange for Madison getting him the votes to push his plans through Congress, Hamilton agrees to support the placement of the U.S. capital in the south.

== Cabinet Battle #2 ==
"Cabinet Battle #2"

Song by Christopher Jackson, Daveed Diggs, Lin-Manuel Miranda, Okieriete Onaodowan, and the cast of Hamilton

from the album Hamilton
- Released: 2015
- Genre: Hip hop; show tune
- Length: 2:23
- Songwriters: Lin-Manuel Miranda; Sean Combs; James Mtume; Jean-Claude Olivier; Christopher Wallace

Audio
- "Cabinet Battle #2" on YouTube

"Cabinet Battle #2" is the seventh song from Act II of the musical Hamilton. Like "Cabinet Battle #1", this track again starts with George Washington informing the audience of the main issue: whether to give aid to France during the beginning of the French Revolution in 1789 and their potential war with Britain. He goes on to clarify that this debate will not come to a vote, they only need to convince Washington himself.

=== Jefferson's verse ===
Jefferson and Madison start the rap battle by reminding the cabinet that France aided the American Revolutionaries during their hour of need. Jefferson also argues that because the Americans signed a treaty between themselves and King Louis XVI, they are honor bound to give aid to them as they enter a war with Britain. Jefferson then insults Hamilton, accusing him of being greedy and stating that he is disloyal. Jefferson notes that he is Secretary of State, not Hamilton, implying that he should have more influence on this decision than the Secretary of Treasury.

=== Hamilton's verse ===
Hamilton comes out with a furious statement asserting that Washington would never agree with Jefferson because the new found United States are too disorganized and vulnerable to get involved in international affairs. Indeed, this is evident in George Washington's Farewell Address (written, at least in part, by Hamilton) as the first president promotes neutrality.

Next, Alexander discredits Thomas Jefferson's wish to uphold the treaty with France by arguing that the United States is not beholden to France because Louis XVI had been killed in the revolution.

=== Washington's decision ===
Cutting Hamilton's rap short, Washington sides with Hamilton, asking him to draft the Proclamation of Neutrality. Jefferson tries to protest by saying that the French are fighting for liberty just like the Americans, but Washington points out that the Americans fought an organized war against a clear enemy while the French commoners are simply rioting and overthrowing the hierarchy with no future plans or leaders. Jefferson, furious, confronts Hamilton and accuses him of abandoning Lafayette, the famed French general who aided the Americans during the American Revolution and one of Jefferson's and Hamilton's closest friends. Hamilton responds quickly, saying that he trusts Lafayette to take care of himself and that he was friends with Lafayette before Jefferson. Jefferson leaves the fight while he warns Hamilton that he is powerless without Washington's support. This would prove true during John Adams's presidential administration. This leads into "Washington on Your Side," in which Jefferson, Madison, and Aaron Burr express their contempt for Hamilton and begin to plot against him.

== Cabinet Battle #3 ==
"Cabinet Battle #3"

Song by Lin-Manuel Miranda

from the album The Hamilton Mixtape
- Released: 2015
- Genre: Hip hop; show tune
- Length: 2:49
- Songwriters: Lin-Manuel Miranda; Tupac Shakur; Rufus Cooper III; Katari Cox; Yafeu Fula; Joseph Paquette; Bruce Washington, Jr.; Tyrone Wrice

Audio
- "Cabinet Battle #3" on YouTube

Cabinet Battle #3 is not in the original Hamilton musical - rather, it is in a subsequent album released by Lin-Manuel Miranda, entitled The Hamilton Mixtape. As before, Washington introduces the issue on the table: a proposal drafted by Benjamin Franklin to end the slave trade and emancipate all current slaves in America.

=== Jefferson's verse ===
Jefferson acknowledges that slavery is an evil, but argues that the government had already sworn not to consider abolishing it until 1808; this was a necessary compromise to get the southern states on board with the new American government. He further adds that even if slavery were abolished, anti-black racism would still exist, and there's no clear solution on what to do with the newly freed slaves. ("So back to Africa? Or do they get a separate state?") He finally says that he previously tried to ban slavery but couldn't drum up any political support, making Franklin's proposal politically impossible even given the injustice of slavery.

=== Hamilton's verse ===
Hamilton castigates the idea of waiting until 1808 to do anything about slavery, pointing out that as the population grows, it will become harder and harder to deal with the problem. He also tells Washington that their tolerance of slavery will destroy the way that history looks upon them. ("Sir, even you, you have hundreds of slaves, whose descendants will curse our names when we're safe in our graves.") He mocks Jefferson's concerns, arguing that petty concerns such as the south needing labor for its businesses or Jefferson taking slave mistresses are less important than stamping out slavery, and he references Sally Hemings by name.

=== Madison's verse ===
Madison proposes a compromise in which he will pledge to the south that abolition will not be considered before 1808, as previously agreed, and will pledge to the north that the slave trade will be ended on January 1, 1808. That, he says, will handle the worst of slavery's abuses without driving away the south. He then says that, once his compromise is accepted, he will draft a motion that slavery will never again be considered by the government. Jefferson and Madison—who know about Hamilton's affair with Maria Reynolds—point out that Hamilton has no room to criticize others for taking mistresses.

=== Washington's decision ===
Washington accepts Madison's proposal. Hamilton protests, but Washington says that if they try to abolish slavery then every plantation owner will demand compensation, which the government doesn't have. After he sighs that maybe the next generation will come up with a better plan, the song ends.

== Critical reactions ==
The musical has received critical acclaim and praise in its first year on the Broadway track.

Talib Kweli, after seeing the show, noted that Daveed Diggs's performance was especially powerful in the rap/Broadway combination Miranda employs in his writing, not to mention in the "brilliance" that is "Cabinet Battle #1". "The guy who plays Jefferson, as soon he came onstage and did a couple of bars, I was like, 'That's an MC. That's not a traditional Broadway dude. That's a guy who raps and was put in this play because he raps.'"

Miranda Brookshire argues that Cabinet Battle #3 drew a false equivalency between the Hamilton-Reynolds affair, which was consensual, and Jefferson's affair with Sally Hemings, who was an enslaved minor and could not consent.

== Certifications ==
Certifications for "Cabinet Battle"
Region	Certification	Certified units/sales
United States (RIAA) Cabinet Table #1	Platinum	1,000,000^{‡}
United States (RIAA) Cabinet Table #2	Gold	500,000^{‡}
^{‡} Sales+streaming figures based on certification alone.
