= Best of Wives and Best of Women =

2015 song from the musical Hamilton

Song by Phillipa Soo, Lin-Manuel Miranda from the musical Hamilton

from the album Hamilton
- Released: 2015
- Genre: show tune
- Length: 0:47
- Songwriter: Lin-Manuel Miranda

Audio
- "Best of Wives and Best of Women" on YouTube

"Best of Wives and Best of Women" is a short number from the second act of the 2015 musical Hamilton, a musical biography of American Founding Father Alexander Hamilton, which premiered on Broadway in 2015. Lin-Manuel Miranda wrote both the music and lyrics to the song. Phillipa Soo and Miranda performed the song on the original Broadway album. The song was the basis of a TikTok trend in 2025.

== History ==
Though the song was not a part of the Vassar College performance of The Hamilton Mixtape, the precursor to the Broadway musical, in 2013, it was included in the musical when it premiered at The Public Theater, in 2015.

== Setting ==
Former Secretary of the Treasury Alexander Hamilton, having arranged a dawn duel with then U.S. vice president Aaron Burr, and anticipating his death, is writing late into the night, when his wife Elizabeth Schuyler Hamilton, Eliza, asks him to "come back to sleep". Alexander explains in an affectionate manner, that he's just writing something before he has to leave for a "meeting" at dawn, and Eliza, echoing sentiments, and leitmotif, expressed in That Would Be Enough, and Take a Break, assures him that his presence is enough. Hamilton's last words to Eliza in the song, and in the musical before his death, are "best of wives and best of women".

== Analysis ==
The song features some of the words, including its title, featured in the real Hamilton's last letter to his wife. The chords are those from "It's Quiet Uptown". It does not feature the ensemble cast. In 2020, Jennifer Forestal and Menaka Philips of The Washington Post listed the song as evidence of Hamilton's acknowledgement of the "unsung labors of wives", echoing Hamilton's historically attested devotion to Eliza.

== Reception ==
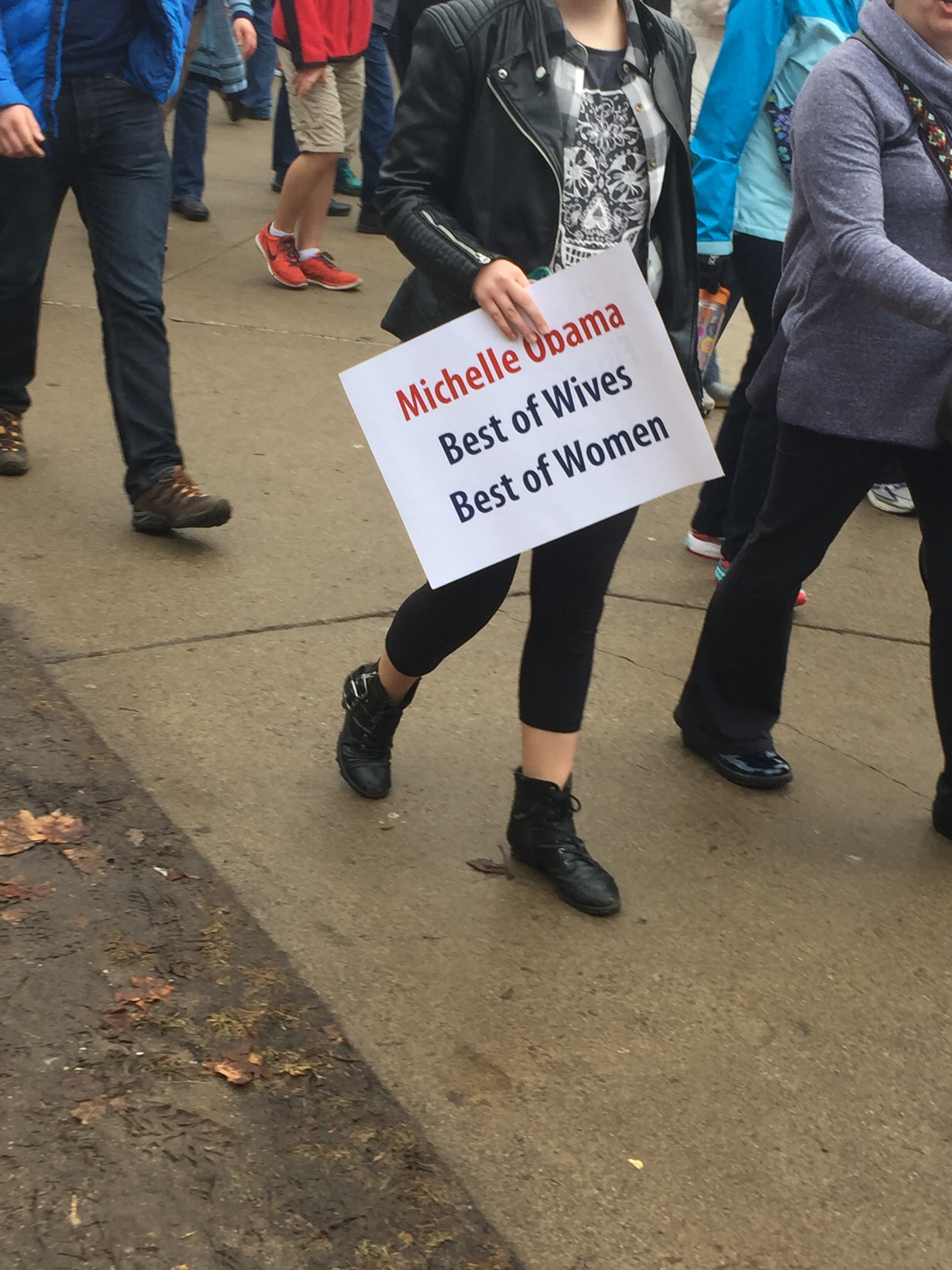
A demonstrator holds a placard with the title of the song dedicated to Michelle Obama at Ann Arbor Women's March in January 2017

Artist Stef Masciandaro's painting inspired by the song was featured in Arielle Jovellos's art collection, "#Ham4Pamphlet", inspired by the songs of the musical.

== TikTok trend ==
In July 2025, Irish TikToker Zoe Coyle, actuallyhamilt0n, posted a clip portraying Alexander attempting to sneak out of a window, as a lip dub to the track. Released around the ten year anniversary of the Broadway musical, re-enactments of the clip began to trend on TikTok and other short video platforms. Many of the recreations featured gender flipped portrayals.

At a screening of the film version of the musical, in September 2025, actors Lin-Manuel Miranda and Phillipa Soo re-enacted the trend in the audience. Soo had also recreated it at a pre-screening photoshoot.

== Certifications ==
Region	Certification	Certified units/sales
United States (RIAA)	Gold	500,000^{‡}
^{‡} Sales+streaming figures based on certification alone.

== Sources ==
- Travis, Matthew L. (April 21, 2017). "Hamilton: A Musical Analysis of Ensemble Function" (PDF). University of Connecticut.
