= One Last Time (Hamilton song) =

Song by Christopher Jackson, Lin-Manuel Miranda, and the cast of Hamilton

from the album Hamilton
- Released: 2015
- Genre: Show tune; gospel; R&B
- Length: 4:59
- Songwriter: Lin-Manuel Miranda

Audio
- "One Last Time" on YouTube

"One Last Time" is the ninth song from Act 2 of Hamilton. It was first performed on Broadway by Christopher Jackson, in the role of George Washington, with Lin-Manuel Miranda as Alexander Hamilton.

== Synopsis and sources ==
The song portrays George Washington's decision not to run for re-election as President, thereby introducing America to the practice of a peaceful transition between administrations. He asks Hamilton to write his final address to the American people, discussing his philosophy of governance and the importance of knowing "how to say goodbye", and discusses his desire to retire and live the rest of his life outside public scrutiny. The song's second half includes an excerpt from the actual historical text of Washington's farewell address; Hamilton reads the address, as Washington sings the same words to a melody.

In addition to the Farewell Address, the song also quotes a verse of the Bible: "Everyone shall sit under their own vine and fig tree, and no one shall make them afraid" (Micah 4:4, 1 Kings 4:25 and 2 Kings 18:31). Washington himself was fond of quoting this line in his correspondence.

The segment in which Washington sings along as Hamilton reads the text of the Farewell Address was inspired by will.i.am's song "Yes We Can", in which performers sing along to a speech by Barack Obama. In December 2018, Miranda released a remix version of the song featuring Obama as a guest performer reciting the extracts of the farewell speech.

A fragment of this song is reprised in Hamilton's soliloquy in "The World Was Wide Enough".

"One Last Time" is a cut-down version of the off-Broadway prior version called "One Last Ride".

== Live performances ==
The cast of Hamilton performed this song for the Obama White House as they neared the end of their eight-year tenure. Obama led the room in a standing ovation. Hamilton cast member Bryan Terrell Clark said "There's no way that any actor on that stage can say the words that we're saying and ignore the political climate that we're immersed in right now." Mashable explains the point of the song: "No matter how many people chant "Four more years!"—he believes his duty is to be a citizen and exit gracefully."

== Style ==
The song has a "resonant gospel sound". Different interpretations of the song have ranged from "forceful Gospel preacher" to "smooth R&B crooner".

== Critical reception ==
Vibe asserted that Washington "sings his heart out". The Huffington Post thought that the drum beats in this song had a "GarageBand-y" character, which contrasted with Jackson's impressive vocals.

In June 2026, CBS News included the song in its list of the 250 essential American songs of the past 250 years.

== Remix ==
On December 21, 2018, "One Last Time (44 Remix)" featuring Original Broadway Cast Member Christopher Jackson, BeBe Winans, and 44th President of the United States Barack Obama was released as the final "Hamildrop". The remix peaked at number 38 on the Digital Song Sales chart and number 22 on the Hot R&B Songs chart.
