= The Schuyler Sisters =

Song from the 2015 musical Hamilton

Song by Renée Elise Goldsberry, Phillipa Soo, Jasmine Cephas Jones, Leslie Odom Jr., and the cast of Hamilton

from the album Hamilton
- Released: 2015
- Genre: R&B; soul; show tune
- Length: 3:07
- Songwriter: Lin-Manuel Miranda

Audio
- "The Schuyler Sisters" on YouTube

"The Schuyler Sisters" is the fifth song from Act 1 of the musical Hamilton, based on the life of Alexander Hamilton, which premiered on Broadway in 2015. Lin-Manuel Miranda wrote both the music and lyrics to the song.

== Background ==
Musical director Alex Lacamoire explained that the song originally had a throwback Daft Punk/Pharrell Williams quality, but after viewing a series of Vines with the three actresses improvising on Destiny's Child songs, he reworked the song to give it similar characteristics, then let the sisters add their own harmonies to the tune; he "realized there's nothing in the song as cool as the harmonies the girls do when they're messing around, so we... just let them riff".

== Synopsis ==
The song introduces the three Schuyler sisters: Angelica, Eliza, and Peggy, their different personalities and views, and how they are excited to be in a new age, amidst the powder keg of the early days of the revolution. The song begins by mentioning how rich people love "slumming it" with poor individuals and how the Schuyler sisters sneak into the city without their father's permission and watch all the men working. Eliza's personality is showcased in the song as being excited about the revolution. Angelica is eager to be freed, however she protests for women's rights, which shows her intelligence. Meanwhile, Peggy feels bad about sneaking downtown and wants to obey her father. Burr tries to flirt with Angelica, but Angelica rejects him and instead professes how she wants a "revelation" instead of a "revolution."

== Style ==
The New Yorker described the sisters as a "Destiny's Child-esque R&B girl group." Pitchfork said the song wouldn't sound out of place in an album by Wyclef protégé City High. The Guardian said the number "combines TLC with the Andrews Sisters and a hat tip to 'Three Little Maids From School Are We'". WIUX described it as "a pre-pre-feminist power anthem".

== Critical reception ==
Entertainment Monthly says this song marks the moment when "the album really kicks it into high gear." Jeff Lunden of Byline said that this is the song he keeps "more or less in constant rotation". When Miranda appeared on the West Wing Weekly podcast, he said that the line "I'm looking for a mind at work" was taken from the TV series The West Wing.

== Certifications ==
Certifications for "The Schuyler Sisters"
Region	Certification	Certified units/sales
United Kingdom (BPI)	Gold	400,000^{‡}
United States (RIAA)	2× Platinum	2,000,000^{‡}
^{‡} Sales+streaming figures based on certification alone.
