= Ten Duel Commandments =

2015 song from the musical Hamilton

Song by Anthony Ramos, Lin-Manuel Miranda, Jon Rua, Leslie Odom Jr. and the cast of Hamilton

from the album Hamilton
- Released: 2015
- Genre: Hip hop; show tune
- Length: 1:46
- Songwriter(s): Lin-Manuel Miranda; Christopher E. Martin; Khary Kimani Turner

Audio
- "Ten Duel Commandments" on YouTube

"Ten Duel Commandments" is the fifteenth song from Act 1 of the musical Hamilton, based on the life of Alexander Hamilton, which premiered on Broadway in 2015. Lin-Manuel Miranda wrote both the music and lyrics to the song.

== Synopsis ==
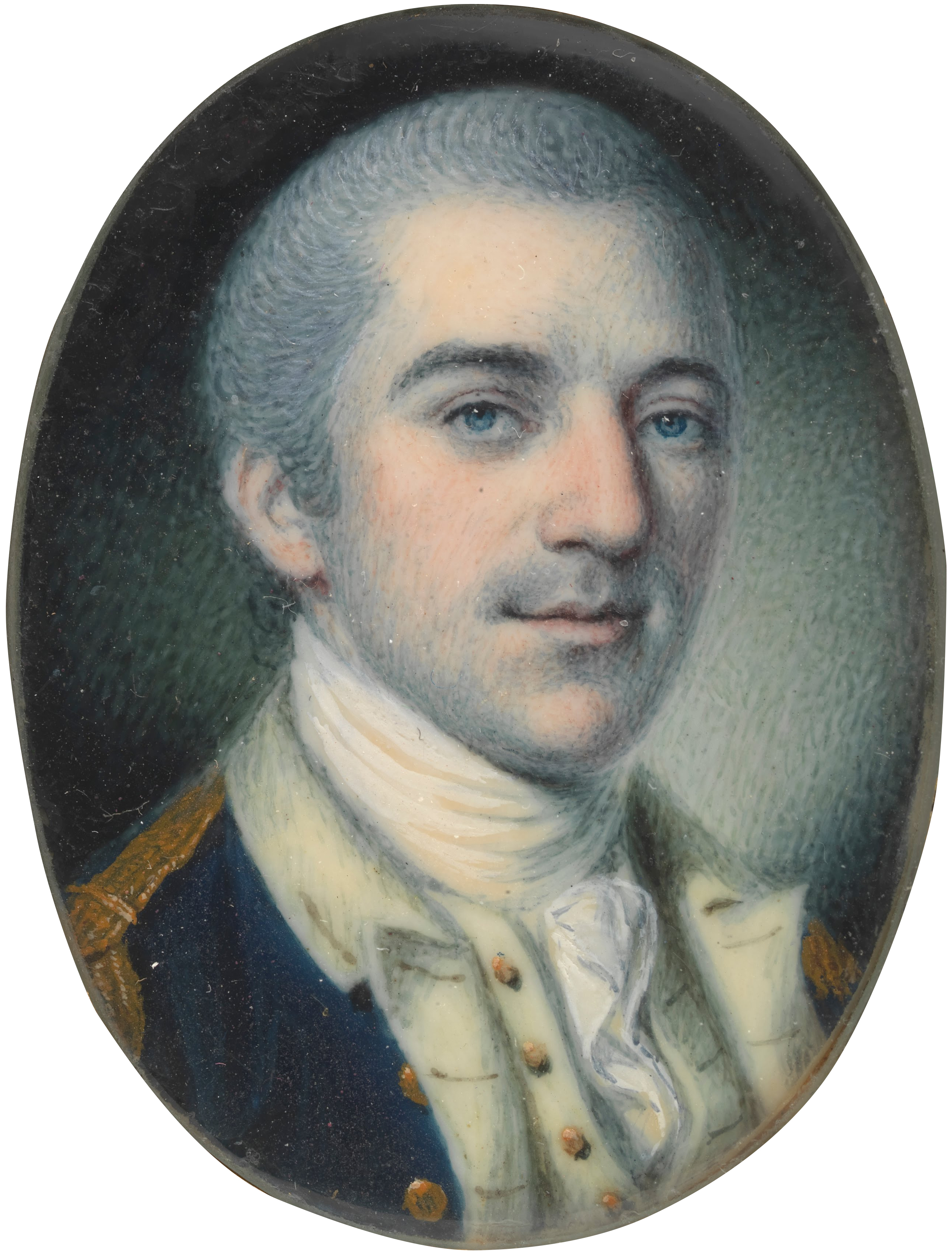
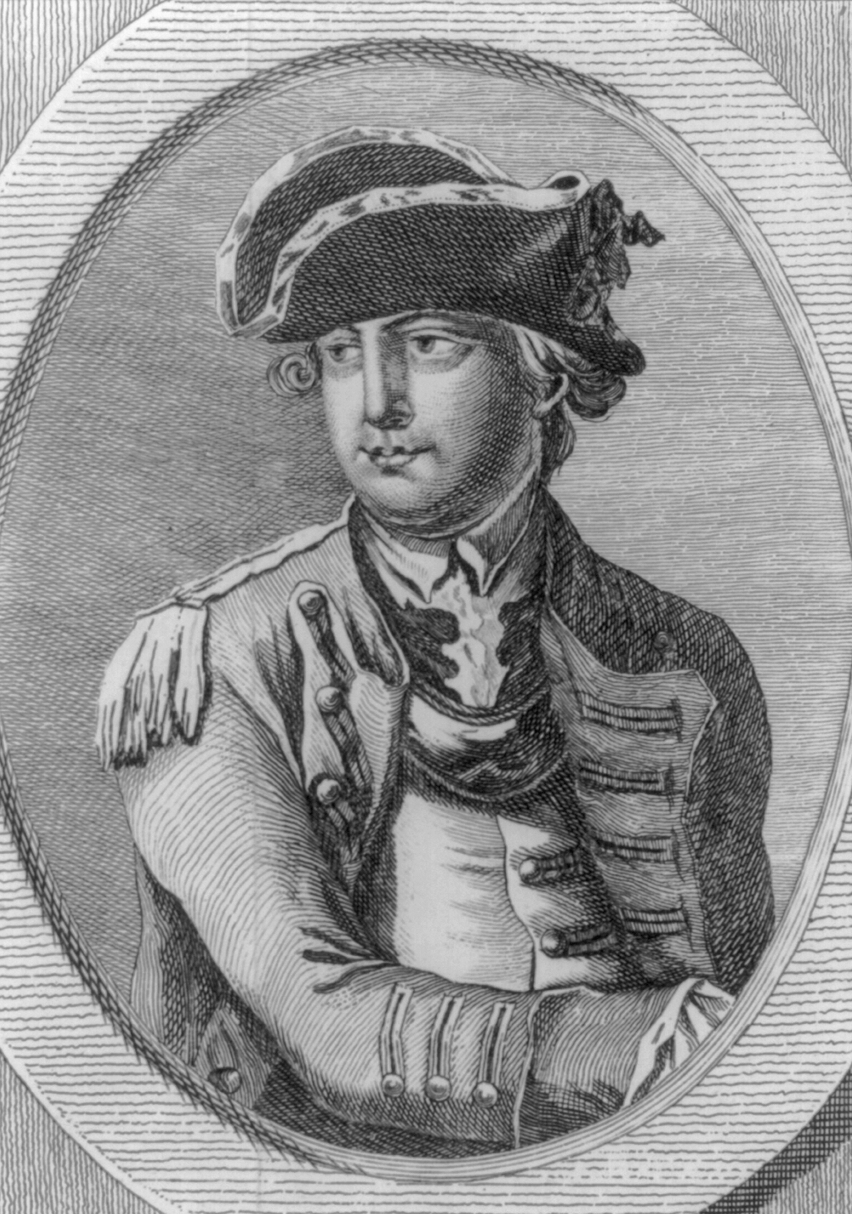
John Laurens (left) and Charles Lee (right), who fought a non-fatal duel on 24 December 1778.

The song recounts a duel which occurred between John Laurens and Charles Lee. The duel took place as a result of disparaging remarks made by Lee about George Washington following Lee's dismissal from the role of Major General in the Continental Army in the wake of Lee's failure at the Battle of Monmouth. The lyrics describe the typical process of a duel during the era in a manner modelled on the Ten Commandments. Laurens demands satisfaction from Lee. After Lee refuses, Laurens challenges him to a duel, and the two men recruit their respective seconds, Alexander Hamilton and Aaron Burr, the relationship between whom is a central theme in the show. Before the duel begins, Hamilton and Burr make a final attempt to negotiate a resolution, in which Burr speaks out against the practice, whereas Hamilton insists that Lee answer for his remarks and conduct at Monmouth. The duel results in Laurens non-fatally shooting Lee in the side after Hamilton encourages him to "not throw away his shot", a motif in the show and expression of the time.

=== Ten Duel Commandments ===
1. Demand satisfaction. No dueling is necessary if they apologize.
2. If they do not apologize, choose someone to act as your second, your lieutenant.
3. Have your seconds negotiate a resolution, or the location and date for the duel.
4. If a duel is settled, choose your weapons and have a doctor present.
5. Duel before dawn.
6. Write a note for your next of kin.
7. Confess your sins.
8. Once again, have your seconds attempt to negotiate peace.
9. Aim no higher than the dueler's eye.
10. Count ten paces, then fire.

=== Historical differences ===
In the song, Aaron Burr serves as Lee's second, while in real life that role was filled by major Evan Edwards.

== Analysis ==
The eponymous ten commandments refer to the Ten Commandments of the Abrahamic faiths, which guide followers on how to live their lives. Miranda also stated that the concept of ten commandments stemmed from the "Ten Crack Commandments", which served as a guide to illegal acts during the 1990s, as well as being a song by the Notorious B.I.G. This connection is acknowledged in the credits of the 2020 filmed version of Hamilton, which states that elements of "Ten Crack Commandments" are used with permission.

Elizabeth Logan, writing for Huffington Post, stated that the song has a key role in making the audience "comfortable with duels". This becomes important in Act 2 of the musical, where two duels occur in Weehawken, New Jersey. Thus, as per the author, the audience will be on board when "some beloved characters pick up pistols" later on in the musical.

The song receives two reprises at key junctures in the musical: during "Blow Us All Away" when Philip Hamilton and George Eacker are about to duel, and in "The World Was Wide Enough" in the lead-up to the Burr–Hamilton duel. In addition, the counting leitmotif is heard in a modified form in various songs throughout the show, such as in the first of the "Cabinet Battle" songs, where it is orchestrated in baroque counterpoint, and in "Take a Break", where Phillip and his mother Eliza Hamilton argue over and learn about the correct notes on a piano scale and French counting.

== Critical reception ==
The Young Folks had it ranked 29th among songs in Hamilton.

Huffington Post said that the song was a "club-worthy jam", and Vibe.com said that it contained a "strong percussive beat" with the men involved "exuding dominance".

== Certifications ==
| Region | Certification | Certified units/sales |
|---|---|---|
| United Kingdom (BPI) | Silver | 200,000^{‡} |
| United States (RIAA) | Platinum | 1,000,000^{‡} |
^{‡} Sales+streaming figures based on certification alone.
