= Ten Crack Commandments =

Song by The Notorious B.I.G.

from the album Life After Death
- Released: March 25, 1997
- Recorded: 1996–1997
- Genre: Hip-hop; East Coast hip-hop
- Length: 3:24
- Label: Bad Boy; Arista
- Songwriters: Christopher Wallace; Christopher Martin; Khary Kimani Turner
- Producer: DJ Premier

"Ten Crack Commandments" is a song by American rapper The Notorious B.I.G. on disc two of his final studio album, Life After Death. It was written by B.I.G. (credited under his legal name, Christopher Wallace) along with producer DJ Premier.

== Background ==
The song is a step-by-step guide to achieving success as a drug-dealer. Biggie, purportedly, was inspired by an article penned by Khary Kimani Turner (under the pseudonym KT) in the hip hop magazine The Source. The July 1994 article, entitled "On the Rocks: From 1984 to 1994, Ten Years of Crack", included a sidebar, "A Crack Dealer's Ten Crack Commandments" that outlines ten critical rules to help dealers survive and thrive in the drug business.

The crack epidemic of the early 1980s and the early 1990s was the flood of crack cocaine usage in urban communities across the United States. Beginning around the same time as hip hop music became the sound of these same urban areas, the manifestations of the crack epidemic became a key theme in hip hop music.

== Lawsuit ==
Chuck D., co-founder of Public Enemy sued the Notorious B.I.G. estate and DJ Premier for sampling his voice and song "Shut 'Em Down" as he didn't want to be part of a song supporting drug use. The lawsuit was settled in November of 1998.

== Composition ==
"Ten Crack Commandments" does not follow the typical constructs of a hip hop or pop song. It contains no chorus and abandons the typical 16-bar construction of a rap verse. Instead, the song presents the lyrics in a list and offers a short, witty explanation of each.

=== The Ten Crack Commandments ===
1. Never let anyone know how much money you have.
2. Never let anyone know your next move.
3. Never trust anyone.
4. Never use what you sell. ("Know you've heard this before, never get high on your own supply")
5. Never sell where you live.
6. Never give credit.
7. Keep your family and business completely separated.
8. Never keep any weight on you.
9. If you aren't being arrested, stay away from police.
10. Consignment is not for novices.

== Legacy ==
Billboard ranked the song number nine on their list of the 25 greatest Notorious B.I.G. songs. Lin-Manuel Miranda paid homage with the song "Ten Duel Commandments" in the musical Hamilton.

== Certifications ==
Certifications for "Ten Crack Commandments"
Region	Certification	Certified units/sales
New Zealand (RMNZ)	Gold	15,000^{‡}
United Kingdom (BPI) Sales since 2004	Silver	200,000^{‡}
^{‡} Sales+streaming figures based on certification alone.
