= Wait for It (song) =

Song by Leslie Odom Jr. and the cast of Hamilton

from the album Hamilton
- Released: 2015
- Genre: Dancehall; show tune
- Length: 3:14
- Songwriter: Lin-Manuel Miranda

Audio
- "Wait for It" on YouTube

"Wait for It" is the thirteenth song from Act 1 of the musical Hamilton, based on the life of Alexander Hamilton, which premiered on Broadway in 2015. Lin-Manuel Miranda wrote both the music and lyrics to the song. It speaks of Aaron Burr's undying determination in the face of Hamilton's swift rise to influence and power. Vocally, it covers a baritenor range of Ab2 to Ab4.

== Background ==
Miranda explained that the song's refrain appeared to him essentially in its final state while taking the subway to a friend's party. He recorded the refrain on his phone, briefly attended the party, then completed the song on his trip home.

He has commented that "Wait for It" and "The Room Where It Happens" are "two of the best songs I've ever written in my life and [Leslie Odom Jr.] got them both". Odom originated the role of Aaron Burr on Broadway. Miranda further explained the out-of-context significance of the song: "I feel like I have been Burr in my life as many times as I have been Hamilton. I think we've all had moments where we've seen friends and colleagues zoom past us, to success, or to marriage, or to homeownership, while we lingered where we were—broke, single, jobless. And you tell yourself, 'Wait for it.'"

== Synopsis ==
After contemplating his own misfortunes, and Alexander Hamilton's successes, Aaron Burr decides to hang on for now and lie in wait, knowing that his time to shine is coming soon. The A.V. Club further explains "the song finds sympathy for Burr's chronic caution; with a legacy and reputation to protect, he can't risk as much as the ambitious Hamilton, and what will become a murderous rage begins here as mournful jealousy over his rival's ability to openly work for what he wants and believes in". Lin-Manuel Miranda has credited "I am the one thing in life I can control" as his favorite lyric. Miranda wrote part of the song in the historic Morris-Jumel Mansion, a house Burr lived in in his later life, owned by the family of Eliza Jumel, Burr's second wife.

== Style ==
Pitchfork wrote that the song "moves with a dancehall lilt". Allmusic described it as a "tender pop ballad".

== Critical reception ==
The song has received critical acclaim. The Huffington Post wrote that the song "has perhaps the most profound lyrics of the entire libretto", and praised its ability to present Burr as a tragic hero rather than a villain, noting "it complicates everything that comes after because we find ourselves rooting for him". Jezebel noted that this song is "stand-alone enough outside the narrative that it contains no real spoilers", and further described it as a "rich...post-Gyptian meditation". Vibe wrote that in this song, Burr "lifts his own spirits up."

The A.V. Club listed it as one of 20 musical theater numbers from the past 20 years that should become standards, writing that the number, "one of the catchiest, most haunting numbers of an already landmark show...may be the track that best expresses the show's complex perspective". New York Theatre said it was "one of Odom's show-stopping numbers in the musical".

The Daily Telegraph said it is an "instant classic anthem". Screen Fellows writes that the "powerful" song "make[s] a moving case for [Burr's] humanity" by portraying him as an "ultimately sympathetic character". DVC Inquirer deemed it a "standout track". Vogue praised the song as being a "Broadway crossover hits [that] sound[s] like bona fide iTunes single".

== Recordings ==
Leslie Odom Jr. performed the song for the 2015 cast album.

The Hamilton Mixtape, which was released in December 2016, includes a recording of the song in a different arrangement with Usher as the lead vocalist. Usher's version peaked at number 16 on the R&B Digital Song Sales chart.

Odom Jr. recorded an abridged version of the song for a public service announcement regarding the 2020 United States presidential election, urging people to "wait for it" as the votes were counted.

Jennifer Nettles also recorded an arrangement of the song on her 2021 album, Always Like New.

== Certifications ==
Certifications for "Wait for It"
Region	Certification	Certified units/sales
United Kingdom (BPI)	Gold	400,000^{‡}
United States (RIAA)	Platinum	1,000,000^{‡}
^{‡} Sales+streaming figures based on certification alone.
