= Hercules Mulligan =

Irish-American tailor and spy (1740–1825)

- Born: September 25, 1740; Coleraine, Ireland
- Died: March 4, 1825 (aged 84); New York City, U.S.
- Education: Columbia University
- Occupation: Tailor
- Known for: Secret agent for George Washington during the American Revolutionary War
- Spouse: Elizabeth Sanders (m. 1773)
- Children: 3 sons, 5 daughters

Signature
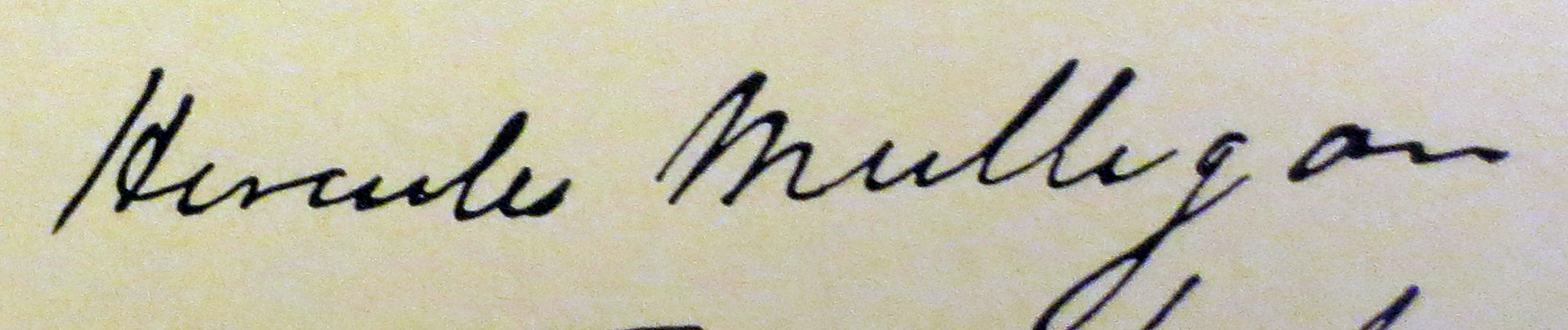

Hercules Mulligan (September 25, 1740 – March 4, 1825) was an Irish-American tailor and spy during the American Revolutionary War, as well as a member of the Sons of Liberty.

== Early life ==
Born in Coleraine in Ireland to Hugh and Sarah Mulligan, Hercules Mulligan immigrated with his family to North America in 1746, settling in New York City, where he was raised from the age of six. Mulligan attended King's College, now Columbia University, in New York City. After graduating, Mulligan worked as a clerk for his father's accounting business. He later went on to open a tailoring and haberdashery business, catering to wealthy officers of the British Crown forces.

On October 27, 1773, Mulligan married Elizabeth Sanders at Trinity Church, established by the Church of England. Sanders was the niece of Admiral Charles Sanders of the British Royal Navy. The couple had eight children: five daughters and three sons.

Mulligan was introduced to Alexander Hamilton shortly after Hamilton arrived in New York by Mulligan's brother, Hugh, and took him on as a lodger. Mulligan also knew the Crugers, Hamilton's patrons for whom he had clerked in St. Croix, and helped Hamilton sell their cargo that was to be used for his education and upkeep. Mulligan helped Hamilton enroll at the Elizabethtown Academy grammar school in New Jersey to prepare for the College of New Jersey (now Princeton University), where he placed Hamilton under the wing of William Livingston, a prominent local American revolutionary, with whom Hamilton lived for a while. Hamilton eventually enrolled at King's College instead, Mulligan's alma mater in New York City. Mulligan had a profound impact on Hamilton's desire for revolution.

== Involvement in the American Revolution ==
In 1765, Mulligan became one of the first colonists to join the Sons of Liberty, a secret society formed to protect the rights of the colonists and to oppose British policies that limited them. In 1770, he clashed with British soldiers in the Battle of Golden Hill. He was a member of the New York Committee of Correspondence, a group that rallied opposition to the British and coordinated with groups in other colonies through written communications. In August 1775, while under fire from HMS Asia, he and a New York volunteer militia company called the Hearts of Oak captured four British cannons in the Battery. In 1776, Mulligan and the Sons of Liberty knocked down a statue of King George III in Bowling Green and then melted the lead to cast bullets to use against the British. Mulligan remained in New York as a civilian unexposed after George Washington's army was driven out during the New York campaign in summer 1776.

While staying with the Mulligan family, Alexander Hamilton came to share Mulligan's views. As a result, Hamilton wrote an essay in 1775 in favor of independence. When Washington spoke of his need for reliable information from within New York City in 1776, after the Continental Army was driven out, Hamilton (who was then an officer on Washington's staff) recommended Mulligan due to his placement as tailor to British soldiers and officers.

This proved to be incredibly successful, with Mulligan saving Washington's life on two occasions. The first occurred when a British officer, who requested a watch coat late one evening, told Mulligan of their plans: "Before another day, we'll have the rebel general in our hands." Mulligan quickly informed Washington, who changed his plans and avoided capture.

Mulligan's slave, Cato, was a Black Patriot who served as a spy together with Mulligan, and often acted the role of courier, in part through British-held territory, by exploiting his status as a slave, letting him pass on intelligence to the Continental Army without being detained. In 1778, Cato was granted his freedom in return for his service during the war. He was discharged in 1783 and moved to Plymouth, Massachusetts.

== After the Revolutionary War ==
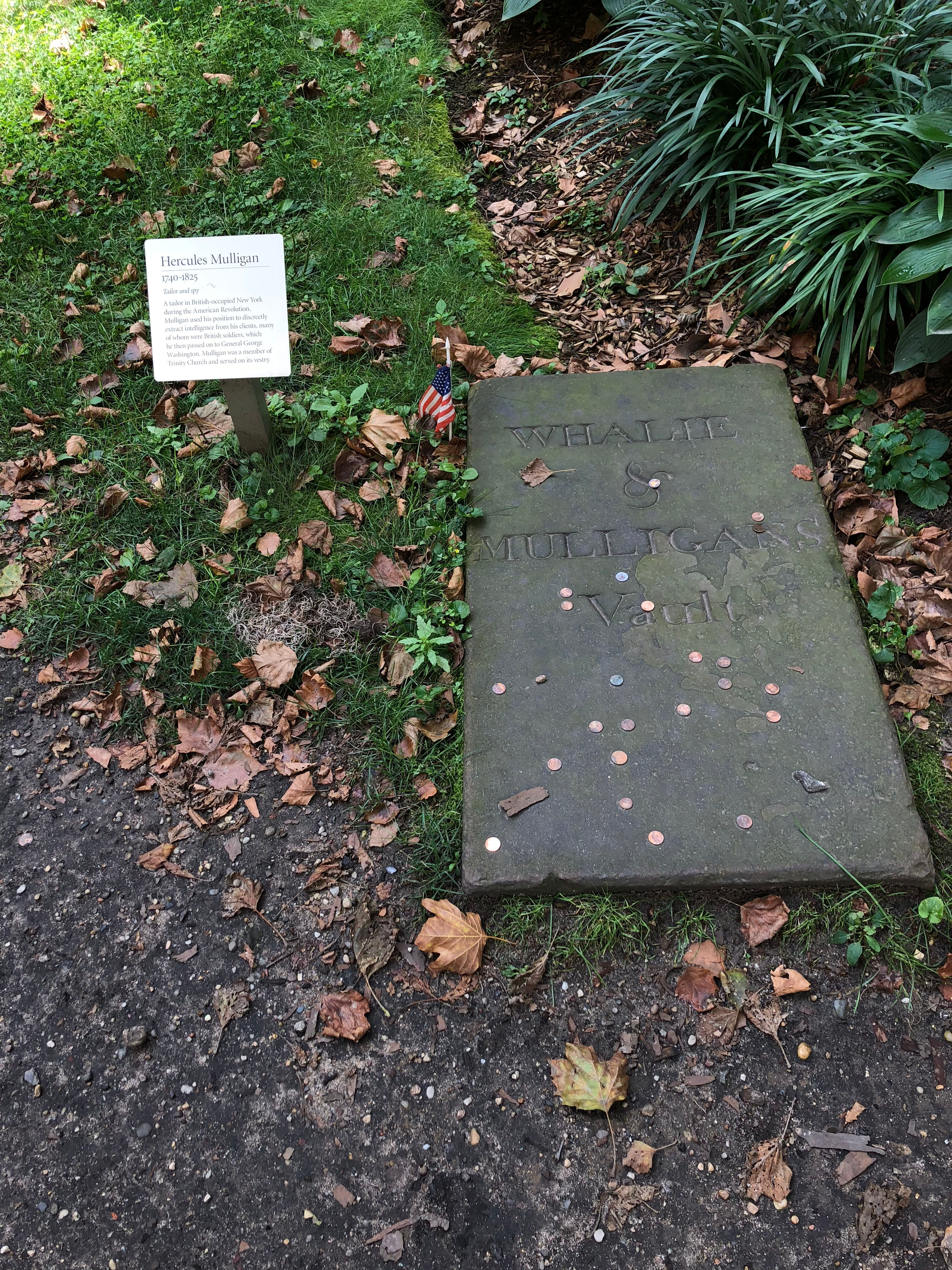
Gravestone of Hercules Mulligan in Trinity Churchyard
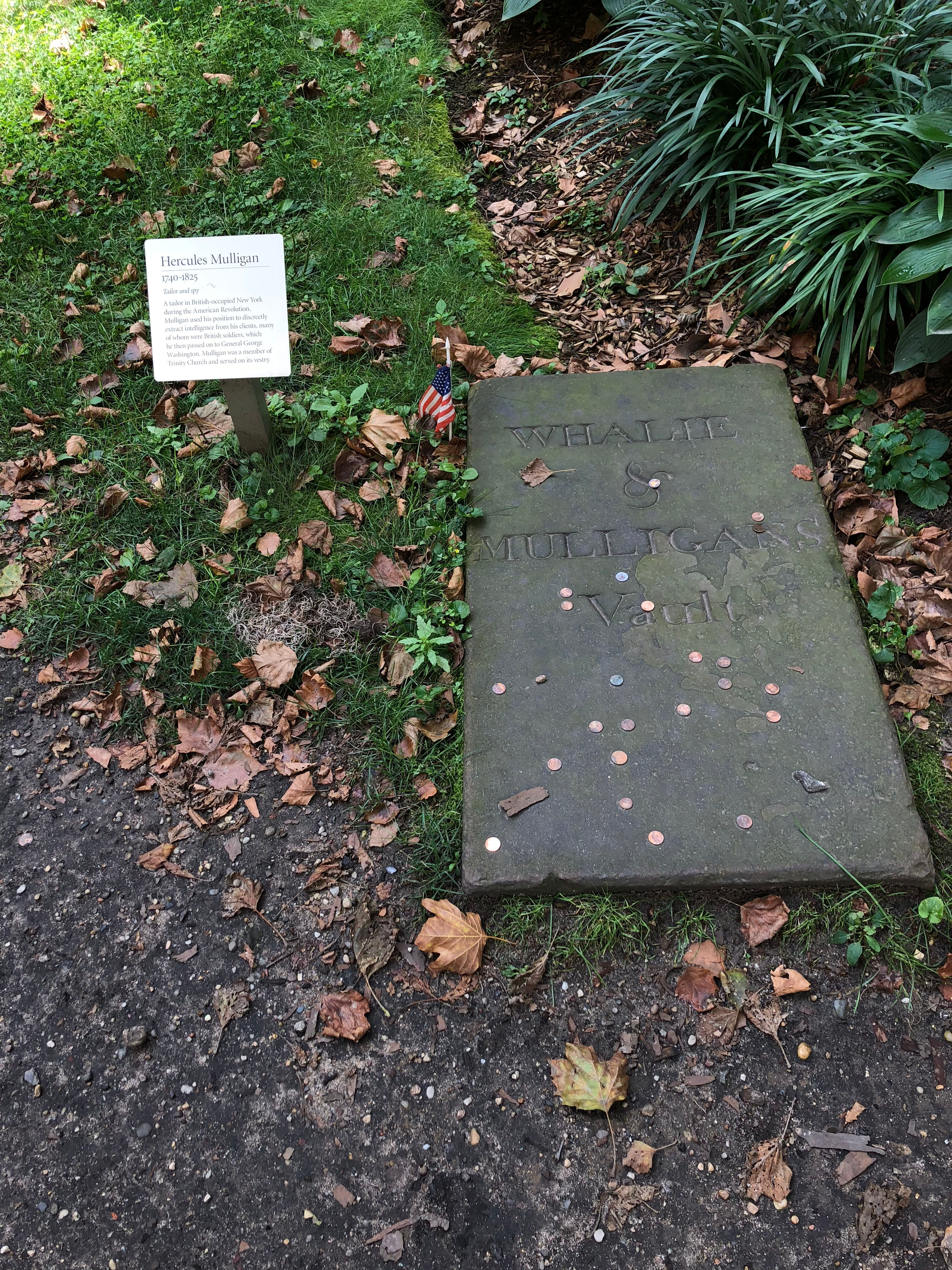
Grave placard

Mulligan was cleared of suspicions of possible Loyalist sympathies after the British evacuated New York City and General Washington entered it at the end of the war, when Washington had breakfast with him on the day after.

On January 25, 1785, Mulligan, Alexander Hamilton, and John Jay became three of the 19 founders of the New York Manumission Society, an early American organization founded to promote the abolition of slavery.

Following the Revolution, Mulligan's tailoring business prospered. He retired in 1820 and died in 1825, aged 84. Mulligan was buried in the Sanders tomb behind Trinity Church. When the church was enlarged, the Sanders tomb was covered. Today, there is a grave stone located in the southwest quadrant of the churchyard bearing Mulligan's name.

== In popular culture ==
The Culper Ring is depicted in the AMC American Revolutionary War spy thriller period drama series, Turn: Washington's Spies, based on Alexander Rose's historical book Washington's Spies: The Story of America's First Spy Ring (2007). Mulligan and Cato are portrayed in the fourth and final season.

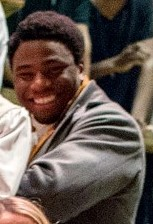
Hercules Mulligan portrayed by Okieriete Onaodowan in Hamilton

In the 2015 Broadway musical Hamilton and its 2020 film release, Mulligan was portrayed by actor Okieriete Onaodowan, who also played James Madison. Mulligan appears in the first act of the play as a friend of Alexander Hamilton, John Laurens, and Marquis de Lafayette, working as a tailor's apprentice and subsequently a soldier and spy in the American Revolution. He features prominently in the songs "Aaron Burr, Sir," "The Story of Tonight" (and its reprise), and "Yorktown (The World Turned Upside Down)". Mulligan initially had a rap that explained his withdrawal from the army, which was eventually cut in order to elaborate on his role of spy in Yorktown.

On Evacuation Day 2019, Hercules Mulligan Rum & Rye was introduced. Its recipe was inspired by Revolutionary War-era Old Fashion cocktails, which often included ginger and bitters, and mixed local rye whiskey with rum since Caribbean rum was made rare due to the Sugar Act of 1764 and British blockades.

== See also ==
- Intelligence in the American Revolutionary War
- Intelligence operations in the American Revolutionary War
