= Okieriete Onaodowan =

Nigerian-American actor

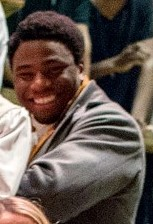
- Onaodowan in 2016
- Born: Newark, New Jersey, U.S.
- Other name: Oak Onaodowan
- Education: Rutgers University, New Brunswick
- Occupations: Actor, singer
- Years active: 2009–present
- Known for: Hamilton and Station 19

Okieriete "Oak" Onaodowan (/ɒˌkɛdiˈɛteɪ oʊˈnaʊdəwɑːn/ o-KED-ee-ET-ay oh-NOW-də-wahn) is an American actor and singer known for his work in musical theatre and television. On stage, he is known for originating the dual roles of Hercules Mulligan and James Madison in the 2015 Broadway musical Hamilton. He starred in Natasha, Pierre & The Great Comet of 1812 as Pierre Bezukhov on Broadway in 2017. On television, he is known for the role of Dean Miller in the ABC drama and Grey's Anatomy spin-off series, Station 19. He also appeared in main roles on the series Jack Ryan and Demascus. He returned to Broadway in 2023 as Nills Krogstead in A Doll's House.

== Early life and education ==
Onaodowan was born in Newark, New Jersey, to Nigerian parents. He and his five sisters were raised in West Orange, New Jersey, He attended Gregory Elementary School and Roosevelt Middle School and West Orange High School, graduating in 2005. Onaodowan briefly played football for his high school, but he stopped after an injury during practice. As a result of the injury, Onaodowan started to explore acting as an alternative extracurricular activity. While attending high school, he began performing with the New Jersey Youth Theatre. After high school, Onaodowan auditioned for and was accepted to the Mason Gross School of the Arts at Rutgers University. He attended for one year.

== Career ==
Onaodowan had roles in Rocky the Musical and Cyrano de Bergerac on Broadway and was in the ensemble of the first national tour of American Idiot. He had the leading role in Young Jean Lee's 2009 play, The Shipment, and played the title role in J.C. Lee's Luce.

By 2015, Onaodowan was an experienced stage actor. He also had several screen credits, including Lou in the feature film Thanks for Sharing and roles in the TV series Gravity and Blue Bloods. He originated the roles of James Madison and Hercules Mulligan in the musical Hamilton both Off Broadway at the Public Theater and subsequently on Broadway. He won a Grammy Award as part of the cast album of Hamilton. Onaodowan was included in the Forbes 30 Under 30 Hollywood & Entertainment list in 2016 for his acting in Hamilton.

On July 11, 2017, he took on the role of Pierre in the musical Natasha, Pierre, and the Great Comet of 1812, replacing the outgoing Josh Groban and Dave Malloy. He took his final bow in this musical on August 13, 2017.

In 2018, he began playing the role of firefighter Dean Miller in the Grey's Anatomy spin-off Station 19. On November 11, 2021, he exited the series, and his character was killed off onscreen. Deadline reported that Onaodowan had asked to leave in order to pursue other opportunities.

In 2023, he made his return to Broadway as Nills Krogstead in Jamie Lloyd’s revival of A Doll's House. In February 2024, he played Buddy Bolden in the Encores! production of Jelly's Last Jam.

== Acting credits ==
=== Film ===
Year	Title	Role	Notes
2012	Thanks for Sharing	Lou	
2017	Person to Person	Lester	
2017	The Super	Cal	
2020	Hamilton	Hercules Mulligan / James Madison	Live stage recording
2020	A Quiet Place Part II	Ronnie	
2021	Generation Wreck	Brandon	
2023	Molli and Max in the Future	Moebias	
2023	American Fiction	Van Go Jenkins	
2026	One Night Only	Tejan	

=== Television ===
Year	Title	Role	Notes
2010	Gravity	Sam	Episode: "Old People Creep Me Out"
2012	NYC 22	Anton Barke	Episode: "Turf War"
2014; 2024	Blue Bloods	Damon Williams / Christopher Kossula	Episodes: "Forgive and Forget" and "The Gray Areas"
2016	Ballers	Anthony	2 episodes
2016	Law & Order: Special Victims Unit	Cash Lewis	Episode: "Broken Rhymes"
2017	Girls	Raneed	Episode: "Painful Evacuation"
2017	The Get Down	Afrika Bambaataa	3 episodes
2017	She's Gotta Have It	Slick Willie	Episode: "#DaJumpoff (DOCTRINE)"
2018–2021	Grey's Anatomy	Dean Miller	5 episodes
2018–2021, 2024	Station 19	Dean Miller	Main role (seasons 1–5), guest role (season 7); 64 episodes
2019	BoJack Horseman	Mike (voice)	Episode: "The Kidney Stays in the Picture"
2020–2021	Robot Chicken	Abraham Lincoln / Night King / Grim Reaper / various (voice)	2 episodes
2020	Social Distance	Reggie	Episode: "Delete All Future Events"
2021	Tuca & Bertie	Timbourine Toucan (voice)	2 episodes
2022	Billions	Leon Sherald	Episode: "Hostis Humani Generis"
2022	Jurassic World Camp Cretaceous	Mr. Gold (voice)	2 episodes
2023	Jack Ryan	Adebayo 'Ade' Osoji	6 episodes, Season 4
2023	Scavengers Reign	Station Chief (voice)	Episode; "The Signal"
2024	Law & Order	Mike Keyz	Episode: "Report Card"
2025	Demascus	Demascus	Main role; 6 episodes

=== Stage ===
Year	Show	Role	Notes
2009	The Shipment	Omar / Michael	The Kitchen
2010	The Last Days of Judas Iscariot	Pontius Pilate	Richmond Shepard Theatre
2010	Neighbors	Sambo Crow	Off-Broadway
2010	Langston in Harlem	Cuban Balladeer	Off-Broadway
2010–2011	Ruined	Simon	Huntington Theatre Company
2010–2011	Ruined	Simon	La Jolla Playhouse
2010–2011	Ruined	Simon	Berkeley Repertory Theatre
2011	American Idiot	Rock & Roll Boyfriend / Ensemble u/s Favorite Son	US National Tour
2012	Cyrano de Bergerac	Pastry Cook / Cadet / Sentry u/s Cuigy u/s Musketeer u/s Carbon de Castel-Jaloux	Original Broadway revival cast
2013	The Brothers Size	Oshoosi Size	Old Globe Theatre
2013	Luce	Luce	Off-Broadway
2014	Rocky the Musical	Dipper Riley / Apollo's Cornerman u/s Apollo Creed	Original Broadway cast
2014	Hamilton	Hercules Mulligan / James Madison	The 52nd Street Project, Workshop
2014	The Royale	Fish	Old Globe Theatre
2015	Hamilton	Hercules Mulligan / James Madison	Off-Broadway
2015–2016	Hamilton	Hercules Mulligan / James Madison	Original Broadway cast
2016	Frozen	Kristoff	Pre-Broadway Workshop
2017	Natasha, Pierre & The Great Comet of 1812	Pierre Bezukhov	Broadway replacement
2023	A Doll's House	Nills Krogstead	Original Broadway revival cast
2024	Jelly's Last Jam	Buddy Bolden	Off-Broadway; Encores!
2025	The Monsters	Big	Two River Theater
2026	The Monsters	Big	Off-Broadway
2026	Romeo & Juliet	Benvolio	Shakespeare in the Park

== Awards and nominations ==
Year	Award	Category	Work	Result
2016	Grammy Award	Best Musical Theater Album	Hamilton	Won
2016	Broadway.com Audience Choice Awards	Favorite Breakthrough Performance	Hamilton	Nominated
