= Hamilton (2020 film) =

2020 American film of the Broadway musical

- Release poster
- Directed by: Thomas Kail
- Written by: Lin-Manuel Miranda
- Based on: Alexander Hamilton by Ron Chernow
- Produced by: Thomas Kail; Lin-Manuel Miranda; Jeffrey Seller
- Starring: Daveed Diggs; Renée Elise Goldsberry; Jonathan Groff; Christopher Jackson; Jasmine Cephas Jones; Lin-Manuel Miranda; Leslie Odom Jr.; Okieriete Onaodowan; Anthony Ramos; Phillipa Soo
- Cinematography: Declan Quinn
- Edited by: Jonah Moran
- Music by: Lin-Manuel Miranda
- Production companies: Walt Disney Pictures; 5000 Broadway Productions; Nevis Productions; Old 320 Sycamore Pictures; RadicalMedia
- Distributed by: Walt Disney Studios Motion Pictures
- Release dates: July 3, 2020 (Disney+); September 5, 2025 (Theatrical)
- Running time: 160 minutes
- Country: United States
- Language: English
- Budget: $12.5 million (stage production)
- Box office: $21 million

Hamilton is a 2020 American musical historical drama film consisting of a live stage recording of the Broadway musical, which was inspired by the 2004 biography Alexander Hamilton by Ron Chernow. Co-produced by Walt Disney Pictures, 5000 Broadway Productions, RadicalMedia, Nevis Productions, and Old 320 Sycamore Pictures, it was filmed over three performances in 2016, directed by Thomas Kail, who co-produced it with Jeffrey Seller and Lin-Manuel Miranda. Miranda, who wrote the music, lyrics, and book, stars as Treasury Secretary/Founding Father Alexander Hamilton, along with the musical's original Broadway cast, including Leslie Odom Jr., Phillipa Soo, Christopher Jackson, Renée Elise Goldsberry, Daveed Diggs, Anthony Ramos, Jasmine Cephas Jones, Okieriete Onaodowan, and Jonathan Groff.

Originally planned for theatrical release on October 15, 2021, Hamilton was impacted by the COVID-19 pandemic and was instead released worldwide by Walt Disney Studios Motion Pictures to stream on Disney+ on July 3, 2020. Acclaimed by critics for its visuals, performances, and direction, it became one of the most-streamed films of 2020. The film was named as one of the best films of 2020 by the American Film Institute, and was nominated for Best Motion Picture – Musical or Comedy and Best Actor in a Motion Picture – Musical or Comedy (Miranda) at the 78th Golden Globe Awards, while Daveed Diggs was nominated for SAG Award for Outstanding Male Actor in a Limited Series or Television Movie. Hamilton was also nominated for 12 Primetime Emmy Awards, winning 2, including Outstanding Variety Special. The film was theatrically released on September 5, 2025 to celebrate the musical's tenth anniversary.

== Synopsis ==
Hamilton narrates Alexander Hamilton's life in two acts, and details among other things his involvement in the American Revolutionary War as an aide-de-camp to George Washington, his marriage to Eliza Schuyler, his career as a lawyer and Secretary of the Treasury, and his interactions with Aaron Burr (the main narrator for most of the musical), which culminates in their duel that ends Hamilton's life.

=== Act I ===
The orphan Alexander Hamilton experiences a difficult early life, but through his wits and the charity of the people of his hometown, he escapes his home—the island of St. Croix—and immigrates to New York City ("Alexander Hamilton"). As a student at King's College in 1776, Hamilton meets Aaron Burr, John Laurens, the Marquis de Lafayette, and Hercules Mulligan ("Aaron Burr, Sir"), and impresses them with his rhetorical skills ("My Shot"). The latter three and Hamilton affirm their revolutionary goals to each other, while Burr remains apprehensive ("The Story of Tonight"). Later, the daughters of the wealthy Philip Schuyler—Peggy, Angelica, and Eliza—go into town and share their excitement about the upcoming revolution ("The Schuyler Sisters"), while loyalist bishop Samuel Seabury argues against the revolution ("Farmer Refuted") and King George III insists on his authority ("You'll Be Back"). During the New York and New Jersey campaign, Hamilton accepts a position as George Washington's aide-de-camp despite longing for field command ("Right Hand Man").

At a ball hosted by Philip Schuyler ("A Winter's Ball"), Eliza falls helplessly in love with Hamilton, who reciprocates her feelings to the point of marriage ("Helpless"), as Angelica suppresses her own feelings for the sake of their happiness ("Satisfied"). After the wedding, Burr and Hamilton congratulate each other's successes ("The Story of Tonight (Reprise)"), and Burr reflects on Hamilton's swift rise compared to his own more cautious career, as well as his affair with Theodosia, the wife of a British officer ("Wait for It").

As conditions worsen for the Continental Army with the Battle of Monmouth ("Stay Alive"), Hamilton aids Laurens in a duel against disgraced Major General Charles Lee ("Ten Duel Commandments"), for which Washington temporarily suspends him from the army ("Meet Me Inside"). Back home, Eliza reveals that she is pregnant with their first child, Philip, and asks Hamilton to slow down to take in the good that has happened in their lives ("That Would Be Enough"). Lafayette convinces Washington to recall Hamilton and grant him field command for the Battle of Yorktown ("Guns and Ships"). Knowing that Hamilton would die a martyr, Washington tells him that he should carefully consider his actions because whatever he does will be remembered for all time ("History Has Its Eyes on You"). At Yorktown, Hamilton works with Lafayette to take down the British and reveals that Mulligan has been working as a spy, helping them trap the British and win the war ("Yorktown (The World Turned Upside Down)").

Soon after the victory of Yorktown, King George asks the newborn America how it will succeed on its own ("What Comes Next?"). Hamilton's son Philip is born, while Burr has a daughter, Theodosia, and the two new fathers promise their children that they will do anything to protect them ("Dear Theodosia"). Hamilton receives word that Laurens has been killed in a pointless battle with evacuating British troops after the war was already over and responds to his grief by throwing himself into his work ("Tomorrow There'll Be More of Us (The Laurens Interlude)"). Over the next decade, both Hamilton and Burr return to New York and work as lawyers. Through his work and writing, Hamilton rapidly gains influence, participates in the Constitutional Convention, co-authors The Federalist Papers and is selected as Secretary of the Treasury by newly elected President Washington, amidst Eliza begging him to slow down and Angelica moving to London with her new husband ("Non-Stop").

=== Act II ===
In 1789, Thomas Jefferson returns to America from being the U.S. ambassador to France, taking up his newfound position as Secretary of State ("What'd I Miss"). Jefferson and James Madison debate against Hamilton's financial proposals at a Cabinet meeting. Washington orders Hamilton to figure out a compromise to push his plan through Congress ("Cabinet Battle #1"). Eliza and her family—along with Angelica, visiting from London—travel upstate during the summer, while Hamilton stays home to work on the compromise ("Take a Break"). Hamilton begins an affair with Maria Reynolds, making him vulnerable to her husband's extortion ("Say No to This"). Hamilton, Jefferson, and Madison finally reach a compromise over a private dinner: they will push through Hamilton's financial plan in exchange for placing the country's permanent capital on the Potomac River. Burr is envious of Hamilton's sway in the government and wishes that he had similar power ("The Room Where It Happens"). Burr switches political parties and defeats Hamilton's father-in-law Philip Schuyler in a race for the Senate, now making Hamilton a rival ("Schuyler Defeated").

In another Cabinet meeting, Jefferson and Hamilton argue over whether the United States should assist France in its conflict with Britain. President Washington ultimately agrees with Hamilton's argument for remaining neutral ("Cabinet Battle #2"). In the wake of this, Jefferson, Madison, and Burr decide to join forces to find a way to discredit Hamilton ("Washington on Your Side"). Washington retires from the presidency after his second term, and Hamilton assists in writing his farewell address ("One Last Time"). A flabbergasted King George receives word that George Washington has stepped down, and will be replaced by John Adams ("I Know Him"). Adams fires Hamilton, who, in response, publishes an inflammatory critique of the new president ("The Adams Administration").

Jefferson, Madison, and Burr confront Hamilton about James Reynolds's blackmail years earlier, accusing him of embezzlement ("We Know"). Desperate to salvage his political career by proving that he was merely lustful and not corrupt, Hamilton reminisces over his life and how writing has always saved him ("Hurricane"), before preemptively publicizing his affair in the Reynolds Pamphlet, which wrecks his own reputation ("The Reynolds Pamphlet"). It also ruins his relationship with Eliza, who, in heartbroken retaliation, burns all the letters Hamilton wrote her, trying to erase herself from history ("Burn"). At 19 years old, Hamilton's son Philip attempts to defend his father's honor in a duel with George Eacker ("Blow Us All Away"), but is fatally shot ("Stay Alive (Reprise)"), eventually leading to reconciliation between Alexander and Eliza ("It's Quiet Uptown").

Hamilton's surprising endorsement of longtime political enemy Jefferson over Burr in the 1800 presidential election ("The Election of 1800") dramatically intensifies the animosity between Hamilton and Burr, who reaches his breaking point and challenges Hamilton to a duel via an exchange of letters ("Your Obedient Servant"). Hamilton writes his last letter in a rush while Eliza tells him to go back to bed ("Best of Wives and Best of Women"). Burr reflects on the events leading up to the duel, while Hamilton reflects on his legacy, before firing his bullet up in the air. Burr fatally shoots Hamilton, and laments that though he survived, he is destined to be remembered by history as the villain who killed Hamilton ("The World Was Wide Enough"). The musical closes with a reflection on historical memory. Jefferson and Madison reflect on Hamilton's legacy, while Eliza tells how she reinserted herself in history and ensured Hamilton's memory by recording the memories of fellow veterans, raising funds for the Washington Monument, speaking out against slavery, and establishing the first private orphanage in New York City ("Who Lives, Who Dies, Who Tells Your Story"). Finally, alone on stage, Eliza turns toward the audience and quietly weeps.

== Cast ==
- Lin-Manuel Miranda as Alexander Hamilton
- Leslie Odom Jr. as Aaron Burr
- Phillipa Soo as Eliza Hamilton
- Renée Elise Goldsberry as Angelica Schuyler
- Christopher Jackson as George Washington
- Daveed Diggs as Marquis de Lafayette / Thomas Jefferson
- Anthony Ramos as John Laurens / Philip Hamilton
- Okieriete Onaodowan as Hercules Mulligan / James Madison
- Jonathan Groff as George III
- Jasmine Cephas Jones as Peggy Schuyler / Maria Reynolds
- Sydney James Harcourt as Philip Schuyler / James Reynolds / Doctor / Ensemble
- Thayne Jasperson as Samuel Seabury / Ensemble
- Jon Rua as Charles Lee / Ensemble
- Ephraim Sykes as George Eacker / Ensemble

Carleigh Bettiol, Ariana DeBose, Hope Easterbrook, Sasha Hutchings, Elizabeth Judd, Austin Smith, and Seth Stewart also appear as ensemble members.

== Musical numbers ==
Act I

- "Alexander Hamilton" – Aaron Burr, John Laurens, Thomas Jefferson, James Madison, Alexander Hamilton, Eliza Schuyler, George Washington, Angelica Schuyler, Maria Reynolds, and Company
- "Aaron Burr, Sir" – Hamilton, Burr, Laurens, Marquis de Lafayette, Hercules Mulligan, and Company
- "My Shot" – Hamilton, Laurens, Lafayette, Mulligan, Burr, and Company
- "The Story of Tonight" – Hamilton, Laurens, Mulligan, Lafayette, and Company
- "The Schuyler Sisters" – Angelica, Eliza, Peggy Schuyler, Burr, and Company
- "Farmer Refuted" – Samuel Seabury, Hamilton, Burr, Mulligan, and Company
- "You'll Be Back" – King George III and Company
- "Right Hand Man" – Washington, Hamilton, Burr, Mulligan, and Company
- "A Winter's Ball" – Burr, Hamilton, Laurens, and Company
- "Helpless" – Eliza, Hamilton and Company
- "Satisfied" – Angelica, Laurens, Hamilton, and Company
- "The Story of Tonight (Reprise)" – Laurens, Mulligan, Lafayette, Hamilton, and Burr
- "Wait for It" – Burr and Company
- "Stay Alive" – Hamilton, Washington, Laurens, Lafayette, Mulligan, Charles Lee, Eliza, Angelica, and Company (Note: Credited to full company on the original Broadway cast recording.)
- "Ten Duel Commandments" – Laurens, Hamilton, Lee, Burr, and Company
- "Meet Me Inside" – Hamilton, Burr, Laurens, Washington, and Company
- "That Would Be Enough" – Eliza and Hamilton
- "Guns and Ships" – Burr, Lafayette, Washington, and Company
- "History Has Its Eyes on You" – Washington, Hamilton, and Company
- "Yorktown (The World Turned Upside Down)" – Hamilton, Lafayette, Laurens, Mulligan, Washington, and Company
- "What Comes Next?" – King George III
- "Dear Theodosia" – Burr and Hamilton
- "Tomorrow There'll Be More of Us" – Laurens, Eliza, and Hamilton (Note: "Tomorrow There'll Be More of Us", a second reprise to "The Story of Tonight", does not appear on the original Broadway cast recording. Miranda explained that it was "more of a scene than a song, the only scene in the [sung-through] show", and he wanted to reserve the impact of "at least one revelation" that could be experienced more fully onstage.)
- "Non-Stop" – Burr, Hamilton, Angelica, Eliza, Washington, and Company

Act II

- "What'd I Miss?" – Jefferson, Burr, Madison, and Company
- "Cabinet Battle #1" – Washington, Jefferson, Hamilton, and Madison
- "Take a Break" – Eliza, Philip Hamilton, Hamilton, and Angelica
- "Say No to This" – Maria Reynolds, Burr, Hamilton, James Reynolds, and Company
- "The Room Where It Happens" – Burr, Hamilton, Jefferson, Madison, and Company
- "Schuyler Defeated" – Philip, Eliza, Hamilton, and Burr
- "Cabinet Battle #2" – Washington, Jefferson, Hamilton, and Madison
- "Washington on Your Side" – Burr, Jefferson, Madison, and Company
- "One Last Time" – Washington, Hamilton, and Company (Note: Previously titled "One Last Ride" in the Off-Broadway production.)
- "I Know Him" – King George III
- "The Adams Administration" – Burr, Jefferson, Hamilton, Madison, and Company
- "We Know" – Hamilton, Jefferson, Burr, and Madison
- "Hurricane" – Hamilton, Burr, Washington, Eliza, Angelica, Maria, and Company
- "The Reynolds Pamphlet" – Jefferson, Madison, Burr, Hamilton, Angelica, James Reynolds, and Company (Note: "The Reynolds Pamphlet" The song contains a small part of the song "Congratulations" (Off-Broadway).)
- "Burn" – Eliza
- "Blow Us All Away" – Philip, Martha, Dolly, George Eacker, Hamilton, and Company
- "Stay Alive (Reprise)" – Hamilton, Philip, Eliza, Doctor, and Company
- "It's Quiet Uptown" – Angelica, Hamilton, Eliza, and Company
- "The Election of 1800" – Jefferson, Madison, Burr, Hamilton, and Company
- "Your Obedient Servant" – Burr, Hamilton, and Company
- "Best of Wives and Best of Women" – Eliza and Hamilton
- "The World Was Wide Enough" – Burr, Hamilton, Angelica, Philip, and Company
- "Who Lives, Who Dies, Who Tells Your Story" – Eliza, Washington, Angelica, Burr, Jefferson, Madison, Lafayette, Laurens, Mulligan, and Company

End Credits

- "My Shot (Rise Up Remix)" – The Roots featuring Busta Rhymes, Joell Ortiz and Nate Ruess
- "Dear Theodosia" (Instrumental) – Orchestra
- "Exit Music" – Orchestra

== Production ==
Hamilton is edited together from three performances of Hamilton at the Richard Rodgers Theatre in Midtown Manhattan in June 2016 with the original principal Broadway cast members, prior to the departure of Miranda, Leslie Odom Jr., Phillipa Soo, and Ariana DeBose from the production, combined with a few "setup shots" recorded without an audience present. These shots included numbers that were captured with the use of a Steadicam, crane and dolly. The footage, shot by RadicalMedia, was originally filmed to be spliced into the 2016 documentary Hamilton's America. The film includes a one-minute intermission; this is extended to ten minutes for the 2025 theatrical release.

The film features the majority of the original Broadway cast, minus ensemble members Betsy Struxness and Emmy Raver-Lampman, who departed in March and April 2016 respectively – their roles are performed by Hope Easterbrook and Elizabeth Judd. Jonathan Groff, who departed the role of King George III in April and was replaced by Rory O'Malley, returned to reprise his role; he also provides, in character, the voice of the pre-show announcer at the beginning, welcoming the audience to the show.

== Release ==
=== Distribution ===
On February 3, 2020, Walt Disney Studios announced that it had acquired the worldwide distribution rights for the film for $75 million. Disney successfully outbid multiple competitors, including Warner Bros. Pictures, 20th Century Fox (which Disney had acquired in March 2019), and Netflix, who had all expressed interest in the film rights. The deal, reportedly one of the most expensive film rights acquisitions, was negotiated between Endeavor Content and Walt Disney Pictures president Sean Bailey and was placed into motion after Disney CEO Bob Iger approached the producers with personal interest in acquiring the film rights. The film is produced by Miranda, Jeffrey Seller, and Kail.

=== Initial release ===
Hamilton was originally scheduled for an October 15, 2021 theatrical wide release by Walt Disney Studios Motion Pictures, but was later moved up to July 3, 2020, on Disney+, as announced by Disney and Miranda on May 12, 2020 in light of the impact of the COVID-19 pandemic on the film industry and the performing arts, which shut down the Broadway, West End, and touring productions. This move was also done to get the film released in time for the Fourth of July weekend, on the 244th anniversary of the independence of the United States.

=== MPA rating and censorship ===
Hamilton received a PG-13 rating by the MPA for "language and some suggestive material". Two instances of the expletive "fuck" were censored to avoid an R rating; a third, partially unfinished one used in "Say No to This" is retained, making it the first film released by Walt Disney Pictures to feature the expletive. A fourth expletive, "motherfucker", used in "The Adams Administration" is also kept in, but is intentionally bleeped for comedic effect as part of the show and its cast album.

=== Theatrical release ===
On August 6, 2025, Disney announced that the film would finally be released in theaters in the United States and Canada on September 5, 2025 to celebrate the musical's tenth anniversary. This release includes new "Reuniting the Revolution" interviews with the original cast and creators. Further, it was also released in the United Kingdom and Ireland on September 26, and Australia and New Zealand on November 13.

=== Home media release ===
A physical media release of the film was originally planned for a 2022 release. Walt Disney Studios Home Entertainment released the film on Blu-ray Disc and Ultra HD Blu-ray on June 16, 2026. The releases included a sing-along version of the film and two featurettes. The Ultra HD Blu-ray release included art cards, sheet music for "Alexander Hamilton", and a fabric poster.

== Reception ==
=== Audience viewership ===
On the weekend of the film's release, the Disney+ app was downloaded 266,084 times, a 72% increase from the past four weeks' total. TV analytics provider, Samba TV reported that 2.7 million U.S. households streamed the film in its first 10 days on Disney+. In August 2020, it was reported that a "staggering" 37.1% of subscribers (about 22 million) had watched the film over its first month (by comparison, the second-largest viewership portion on a platform was Netflix's Unsolved Mysteries with 13.7%). In November, Variety reported the film was the most watched straight-to-streaming title of 2020 up to that point. In December, research firm Screen Engine reported that Hamilton was the second-most watched straight-to-streaming title of 2020 behind HBO Max's Wonder Woman 1984.

=== 2025 box office performance ===
In the United States and Canada, Hamilton was released alongside The Conjuring: Last Rites, and was projected to gross $7–8 million from 1,800 theaters in its opening weekend. It made $3.9 million on its first day (including $850,000 from Thursday previews), and it went on to debut to $10.1 million finishing in second place behind The Conjuring: Last Rites.

During its second weekend in theaters, Hamilton would fall 78%, making $2.2 million and ranking 7th at the domestic box office.

=== Critical response ===
On the review aggregator website Rotten Tomatoes, 98% of 204 critics' reviews are positive, with an average rating of 9.2/10. The website's consensus reads: "Look around, look around at how beautifully Hamilton shines beyond Broadway – and at how marvelously Thomas Kail captures the stage show's infectious energy." Metacritic, which uses a weighted average, assigned the film a score of 88 out of 100, based on 42 critics, indicating "universal acclaim".

Peter Debruge, in his review for Variety, wrote: "For those fortunate enough to see Hamilton on stage, this will be a welcome reminder of being among the first to witness such a revolutionary piece of American theater. And if you couldn't get tickets at the time (some of which fetched more than the value of Cares Act stimulus payments), this 2 1/2-hour release represents an incredible equalizing moment". Justin Chang of the Los Angeles Times wrote "For those of us who have never seen the stage show, and have compensated by spending many happy hours with the soundtrack, it's a particular pleasure to be figuratively ushered into the live Richard Rodgers Theater audience, whose applause you often hear and whose presence you sometimes glimpse in passing. Unaltered from that initial staging, apart from some seamless editing (by Jonah Moran) and the silencing of a few family-unfriendly expletives, this filmed Hamilton is somehow both a four-year-old time capsule and a timely encounter with the present."

Rafer Guzmán of Newsday gave the film 3 stars out of 4, writing "Directed with a steady hand by Thomas Kail, Hamilton doesn't quite capture the electricity of a live performance, though mid-song laughs and cheers can occasionally be heard from the audience (there's also a one-minute intermission). Hamilton will surely return when Broadway does, but for now this document will serve nicely in its stead." David Ehrlich of IndieWire gave the film a grade of A− and said: "This is Hamilton as you always wanted to see it, and it always will be. And with Disney+ releasing it just in time for the Fourth of July, it doubles as a perfect reminder that America is only worth celebrating because of what it aspires to be — the version of it we see in our minds' eye, and not the one that's petrified on the pages of our history books."

David Rooney, in his review for The Hollywood Reporter, praised Kail's directing by writing "The art of the filmed performance has evolved considerably since the days when a camera or two were plonked down at the rim of the stage and the show unfolded as a static theatrical facsimile. Since staging Hamilton, director Thomas Kail has been sharpening his skills on television work like Grease Live! — still by far the best of the recent spate of live TV musicals — and Fosse/Verdon, a striking hybrid of theatrical performance and conventional narrative."

A. O. Scott of The New York Times named the film a "Critic's Pick", praising the timeliness of its release stating "One lesson that the past few years should have taught — or reconfirmed — is that there aren’t any good old days. [...] This four-year-old performance of 'Hamilton,' viewed without nostalgia, feels more vital, more challenging than ever." In 2024, Tim Grierson of RogerEbert.com named the film the "Best Fourth of July Release of the 21st Century," writing "So many Independence Day releases celebrate spectacle, but few embody the complex beauty of this country and its history. This one does, ravishingly."

=== Accolades ===
Following its release and acclaim, there was speculation on whether it would be eligible for the Academy Awards. Major publications pointed to previous instances of Academy Award-nominated films featuring stage recordings, such as Othello (1965) and Give ‘em Hell, Harry (1975), suggesting the possibility of recognition for Hamilton. However, on July 6, 2020, the Academy of Motion Pictures Arts and Sciences disqualified Hamilton for the 93rd Academy Awards, citing a rule implemented in 1997 that "Recorded stage productions are not eligible for consideration." Disney included Hamilton in its awards consideration campaign and reportedly submitted the film to every organization and award guild, regardless of apparent eligibility. Unlike the Academy, other major organizations that present film awards—such as the Golden Globe Awards and the SAG Awards—have no specific restrictions against filmed theater, and thus recognized the film.

Award	Category	Recipients	Result	Ref.
People's Choice Awards	The Movie of 2020	Hamilton	Nominated	
People's Choice Awards	The Drama Movie of 2020	Hamilton	Won	
People's Choice Awards	The Drama Movie Star of 2020	Lin-Manuel Miranda	Won	
American Cinema Editors Awards	Best Edited Limited Series or Motion Picture for Television	Jonah Moran	Nominated	
American Film Institute Awards	AFI Special Award	Hamilton	Won	
Cinema Audio Society Awards	Outstanding Achievement in Sound Mixing for Television Non Fiction, Variety or Music – Series or Specials	Justin Rathbun, Tony Volante, Rob Fernandez and Tim Latham	Won	
Costume Designers Guild Awards	Excellence in Variety, Reality-Competition, Live Television	Paul Tazewell	Won	
Critics' Choice Awards	Best Movie/ Miniseries	Hamilton	Won	
DGA Awards	Outstanding Directorial Achievement in Movies for Television and Limited Series	Thomas Kail	Nominated	
Golden Globe Awards	Best Motion Picture – Musical or Comedy	Hamilton	Nominated	
Golden Globe Awards	Best Actor – Musical or Comedy	Lin-Manuel Miranda	Nominated	
Hollywood Critics Association TV Awards	Best Streaming Limited Series, Anthology Series, or Live-Action Television Movie	Hamilton	Nominated	
Hollywood Critics Association TV Awards	Best Actor in a Leading Role in a Limited Series, Anthology Series, or Television Movie	Leslie Odom Jr.	Nominated	
Hollywood Critics Association TV Awards	Best Actor in a Supporting Role in a Limited Series, Anthology Series, or Television Movie	Daveed Diggs	Nominated	
Golden Reel Awards	Outstanding Achievement in Sound Editing – Single Presentation	Tony Volante, Dave Paterson, Nevin Steinberg, Dan Timmons and Derik Lee	Nominated	
Make-Up Artists and Hair Stylists Guild Awards	Best Period and/or Character Hair Styling in a Television Special, One Hour or More Live Program Series or Movie for Television	Frederick Waggoner	Won	
NAACP Image Awards	Outstanding Television Movie, Mini-Series or Dramatic Special	Hamilton	Nominated	
NAACP Image Awards	Outstanding Actor in a Television Movie, Mini-Series or Dramatic Special	Daveed Diggs	Nominated	
NAACP Image Awards	Outstanding Actor in a Television Movie, Mini-Series or Dramatic Special	Leslie Odom Jr.	Nominated	
NAACP Image Awards	Outstanding Writing in a Television Movie, Mini-Series or Dramatic Special	Lin-Manuel Miranda	Nominated	
Nickelodeon Kids' Choice Awards	Favorite Movie	Hamilton	Nominated	
Nickelodeon Kids' Choice Awards	Favorite Movie Actor	Lin-Manuel Miranda	Nominated	
Primetime Emmy Awards	Outstanding Variety Special (Pre-Recorded)	Sander Jacobs, Jill Furman, Thomas Kail, Lin-Manuel Miranda and Jeffrey Seller	Won	
Primetime Emmy Awards	Outstanding Lead Actor in a Limited or Anthology Series or Movie	Lin-Manuel Miranda	Nominated	
Primetime Emmy Awards	Outstanding Lead Actor in a Limited or Anthology Series or Movie	Leslie Odom Jr.	Nominated	
Primetime Emmy Awards	Outstanding Supporting Actor in a Limited or Anthology Series or Movie	Daveed Diggs	Nominated	
Primetime Emmy Awards	Outstanding Supporting Actor in a Limited or Anthology Series or Movie	Jonathan Groff	Nominated	
Primetime Emmy Awards	Outstanding Supporting Actor in a Limited or Anthology Series or Movie	Anthony Ramos	Nominated	
Primetime Emmy Awards	Outstanding Supporting Actress in a Limited or Anthology Series or Movie	Renée Elise Goldsberry	Nominated	
Primetime Emmy Awards	Outstanding Supporting Actress in a Limited or Anthology Series or Movie	Phillipa Soo	Nominated	
Primetime Emmy Awards	Outstanding Directing for a Limited or Anthology Series or Movie	Thomas Kail	Nominated	
Primetime Creative Arts Emmy Awards	Outstanding Picture Editing for Variety Programming	Jonah Moran	Nominated	
Primetime Creative Arts Emmy Awards	Outstanding Sound Mixing for a Variety Series or Special	Tony Volante, Tim Latham and Justin Rathbun	Nominated	
Primetime Creative Arts Emmy Awards	Outstanding Technical Direction and Camerawork for a Special	Pat Capone, Jack Donnelly, Bruce MacCallum, Bill Winters, Maceo Bishop, Abby Levine and Joe Belack	Won	
PGA Awards	Outstanding Producer of Streamed or Televised Motion Pictures	Thomas Kail, Lin-Manuel Miranda and Jeffrey Seller	Won	
Satellite Awards	Best Motion Picture – Comedy or Musical	Hamilton	Nominated	
Satellite Awards	Best Actor in a Motion Picture – Comedy or Musical	Lin-Manuel Miranda	Nominated	
Satellite Awards	Best Actor in a Motion Picture – Comedy or Musical	Leslie Odom Jr.	Nominated	
SAG Awards	Outstanding Performance by a Male Actor in a Television Movie or Limited Series	Daveed Diggs	Nominated	

== Other media ==
A behind-the-scenes documentary about the making of the film, entitled Hamilton In-Depth with Kelley Carter, premiered on The Undefeated and Disney+ the same day as the film. It features journalist Kelley L. Carter hosting a roundtable discussion with Thomas Kail and members of the cast about the musical's origins, its significance in pop culture, and how its story and portrayal of historical events resonate with the modern-day discussions about social injustice and systemic racism.

== See also ==
- Hamilton (Original Broadway Cast Recording)
- List of films about the American Revolution
- List of musicals filmed live on stage
