= Burn (Hamilton song) =

Song from the 2015 musical Hamilton

Song by Phillipa Soo

from the album Hamilton
- Released: 2015
- Genre: Show tune
- Length: 3:45
- Songwriter: Lin-Manuel Miranda

Audio
- "Burn" on YouTube

"Burn" is the fifteenth song from Act 2 of the musical Hamilton, based on the life of Alexander Hamilton, which premiered on Broadway in 2015. Lin-Manuel Miranda wrote both the music and lyrics to the song. The song is sung by the character Eliza Hamilton, originally performed by Phillipa Soo.

== Background ==
As Ron Chernow describes in his biography Alexander Hamilton, upon which the show was based, "Eliza Hamilton was a modest, self-effacing woman who apparently destroyed her own letters and tried to expunge her presence from the history books." The song draws on Lin-Manuel Miranda's interpretation of Chernow's assumption that Eliza destroyed some of her correspondence with her husband.

== Synopsis ==
"Burn" comes just after "The Reynolds Pamphlet" as Hamilton, hoping to salvage his professional legacy, admits to his extramarital affair in a public pamphlet. Eliza finds herself as collateral damage in the matter, feeling shattered and betrayed by the revelation. The heartbreak and public humiliation drive her to take control of the story by burning the letters Hamilton wrote to her.

== Analysis ==
Several critics pointed out the apparent meta-references in some of the song's lyrics.

I'm erasing myself from the narrative.
Let future historians wonder
How Eliza reacted when you broke her heart.

Writing for The New Yorker, Michael Shulman noted that, "Surely Miranda is poking fun at his own lack of primary sources when it came to dramatizing this moment in the Hamiltons' marriage. But in embracing the enigma the song points to the larger problem of women's history: the public records are thinner, the milieu is mostly domestic, and there's more need for speculation. What was Eliza really thinking? Was burning her letters the only act of personal agency she had left?"

HuffPost's Elizabeth Logan added that, "It's telling that Eliza refers again and again to Angelica's view on the crisis [of Hamilton's cheating]. This marriage was never just the two of them."

== Critical reception ==
The song received critical acclaim, particularly for Soo's performance. Nora Dominick of Entertainment Monthly said that, "the track makes a lasting impact on the Hamilton album as a whole" and that it "is sure to become another classic number from Hamilton, and it's all thanks to Soo and her strong, heartbreaking portrayal of Eliza."

Writing for The Young Folks, Matt Rice ranked the song #13 out of the album's 46 songs.

== Certifications ==
Certifications for "Burn"
Region	Certification	Certified units/sales
United Kingdom (BPI)	Gold	400,000^{‡}
United States (RIAA)	Platinum	1,000,000^{‡}
^{‡} Sales+streaming figures based on certification alone.

== Mixtape version ==
"Burn"

Promotional single by Andra Day

from the album The Hamilton Mixtape
- Released: 2016
- Length: 3:39
- Songwriter: Lin-Manuel Miranda

Audio
- "Burn" on YouTube

"Burn" is a song from The Hamilton Mixtape performed by Andra Day.

=== Background ===
At the time of recording, Day had not yet seen the musical on Broadway, but was familiar with the story. "I was actually obsessed with Alexander Hamilton in school," she said. She chose to cover "Burn" after being drawn to the "raw, fiery, painful emotion" of Eliza in the song. "I already had such an empathy for her. Even before the show came out, I was like, 'You know what? The guy's a dirtbag.'"

=== Music video ===
A music video for the song was released on August 29, 2018. The video was directed by Aurora Guerrero. Guerrero was recommended to Miranda by famed director Ava DuVernay after Miranda reached out to DuVernay to connect him with a director that he did not already know. Miranda later commented that he was "crazy about" the video that Guerrero put together.

=== Critical reception ===
Marissa Martinelli of Slate ranked the song #4 out of the album's 23 songs. She called Day's version "devastating" and concluded that, "Compositionally, this cover plays it safe, but Day brings such rage and heartbreak to the song that it’s more than just a retread."

== "First Burn" ==
"First Burn"

Promotional single by Arianna Afsar, Julia Harriman, Shoba Narayan, Rachelle Ann Go, and Lexi Lawson
- Released: 2018
- Length: 3:07
- Songwriter: Lin-Manuel Miranda

Audio
- "First Burn" on YouTube

"First Burn" is the fifth promotional single of the Hamildrops collection. The song was released on April 30, 2018, and features five actresses who had played Eliza Hamilton in notable productions of the musical: Arianna Afsar (original Chicago company), Julia Harriman (first and third national tour), Shoba Narayan (original second national tour company), Rachelle Ann Go (original West End company), and Lexi Lawson (Broadway).

=== Background ===
The song is the first draft of "Burn" written by Miranda. Discussing its function within the musical and how the song evolved, Miranda said that, "In the final 'Burn' [Eliza] has agency and makes a decision to destroy Hamilton’s best self. In this draft she’s angrier, but it’s entirely reactive."

He also stated that the draft version worked "as a song but not as a scene" due to the lack of dramatic tension from Eliza burning the letters right from the start, as well as certain lyrics giving away the last song in the show, diminishing it.
