= Sex scandal =

Scandal involving sexual acts by famous people

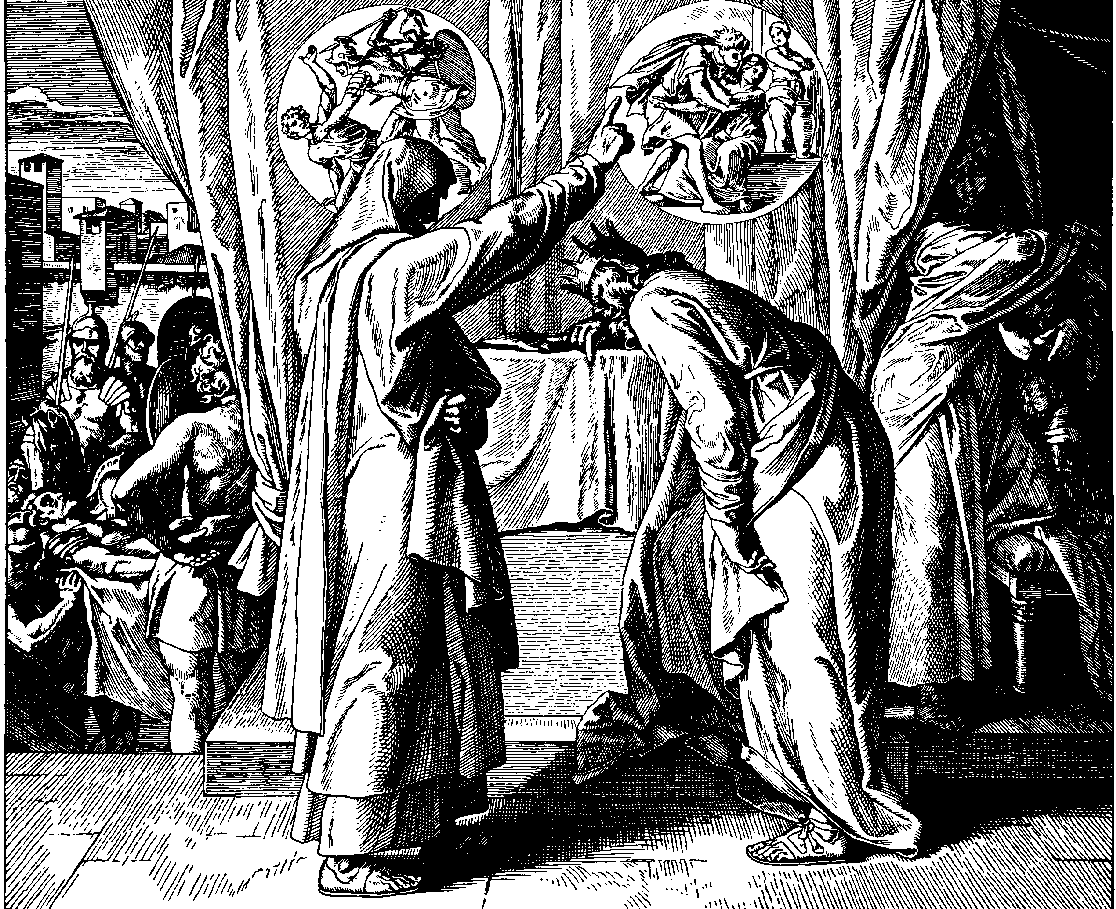
Nathan confronts David over his sex scandal with Bathsheba, saying "by this deed you have utterly scorned the LORD" (2 Samuel 12:14).

A sex scandal is a public scandal involving allegations or information about possibly immoral sexual activities, often associated with the sexual affairs of film stars, politicians, famous athletes, or others in the public eye. Sex scandals receive attention if a prominent figure is involved, if there is a perception of hypocrisy, if a public figure's sexuality is non-normative, or if it involves non-consensual acts. A scandal may be based on reality, the product of false allegations, or a mixture of both. Whether the scandal is based in fact or not, it may lead to the celebrity disappearing from the public eye or to the resignation of prominent political figures.

Sex scandals involving politicians often become political scandals, particularly when there is an attempt at a cover-up or suspicions of illegality. Attempts at coverups include payoffs, threats, or, in extreme cases, murder.

While some commentators see sex scandals as irrelevant to politics, particularly where "professional performance [does] not seem to be impaired", Gene Healy of the Cato Institute views them as not just "great fun", but a reminder that "we should think twice before we cede more power to these fools". An increase in the prevalence of morally questionable expressions of sexuality is sometimes referred to as a sexidemic.

Sex scandals, in relation to political and public figures, often lead to questions of one's own ethics and moral code. A politician who is caught in a sex scandal is more likely to resign than a public figure in the face of a sex scandal.

== History ==
Scandals have been a part of history in major declarations, false truces, when political or celebrity figures need to pay someone off to protect their legacy and more. Scandals can involve bribery, immoral action, shame, slander, misdoing, etc. A story of a sex scandal involving the Biblical figure David is relayed in the Book of Samuel. According to the story, David's infatuation with Bathsheba, a woman married to the elite soldier Uriah the Hittite, leads him to order the execution of Uriah and take Bathsheba as his wife. This action incurs divine retribution in the form of dooming David's offspring in various ways, which is foretold to David by the prophet Nathan. This story is present in the literary canon of the Abrahamic religions of Judaism, Christianity, and Islam, to which it may have provided insight on handling such scandals.

The Hamilton–Reynolds affair, which involved Secretary of the Treasury Alexander Hamilton, who had a one-year affair with Maria Reynolds during George Washington's presidency, is considered one of the first sex scandals in American political history. Political sex scandals in the U.S. have included Alexander Hamilton, Andrew Jackson, Grover Cleveland, Warren Harding, John F. Kennedy, Edward Kennedy, Newt Gingrich, Mark Sanford, Dennis Hastert, John Edwards, Arnold Schwarzenegger, Bill Clinton (whose impeachment pertained to a sex scandal), Donald Trump (whose felony conviction pertained to a sex scandal), Robert F. Kennedy Jr., Gavin Newsom, Jim Bob Duggar and Josh Duggar, Larry Craig, Mark Foley, John Ensign, Bob Packwood, Gerry Studds, Andrew Cuomo, Jim McGreevey, John Conyers, Blake Farenthold, David Petraeus, Anthony Weiner, Al Franken, and Trent Franks.

== Infidelity ==
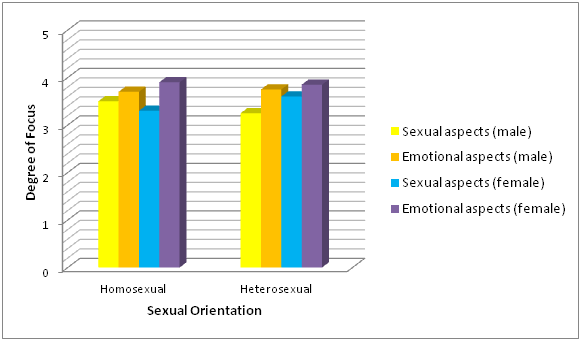
Gender differences in jealousy when looking at actual infidelity

Sex scandals involve sexual affairs which usually, but not always, involve infidelity. Infidelity has many definitions, either based on experience or research done on people who have been involved in the act of disloyalty and trust. To some, infidelity "is a complex phenomenon with multiple reasons driving people to cheat on their partners". A 2018 article in The New York Times cited an American Association for Marriage and Family Therapy national survey, stating "that 15 percent of married women and 25 percent of married men have had extramarital affairs".

== Gender stereotypes in scandals ==
Sex scandals tend to include a bias when it comes to men and women who are caught and then need evidence to explain their situation. A 2015 study concluded that gender stereotypes were "refer(ed) to the meanings that individuals and societies ascribe to males and females". According to Juliet Williams at the University of California, Los Angeles the 1998 Clinton–Lewinsky scandal in the United States made the US Congress, media, and citizens look at male candidates and politicians in a different light by "normalizing public discussion of sex acts." John Edwards, David Petraeus, Anthony Weiner, Arnold Schwarzenegger, are other examples of men involved in sex scandals that have caused the public not to give men the benefit of the doubt. This has caused the debate between politics and sex scandals to be seen in a different light. It has allowed gender-shifting and the role of gender to become more unbiased in the selection of candidates during their evaluation and allows more power for women fighting against stereotypes due to scandals, and men being seen as more skeptical.

A year after the 2017 Harvey Weinstein sexual abuse cases was first reported, leading to the viral spread of the #MeToo movement, New York Times published a list of 201 names of prominent men in the United States who had lost their jobs following public allegations of sexual harassment.

Social attitudes have traditionally been less forgiving when minors are involved. In France, for example, the scandal surrounding Swiss art dealer Yves Bouvier and former call girl Zahia Dehar – for whom Bouvier allegedly acted as a pimp in the late 2000s, paying her to appear at dinners for entertainment when she was 17 years old – has caused outrage and opened a debate about powerful men in society abusing their power. The fall from grace and imprisonment of Anthony Weiner, following his sexting of explicit pictures to a 15-year-old girl, is another notable example of the pre-#MeToo era.

== See also ==
- Casting couch
- Celebrity sex tape
- Deviancy amplification spiral
- List of federal political sex scandals in the United States
- Category:Sex scandals
- Weinstein effect
