= Phillipa Soo =

American actress (born 1990)

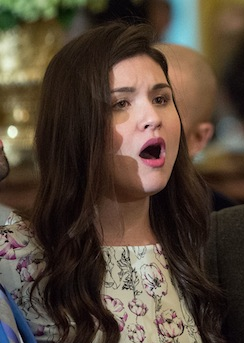
- Soo at the White House in March 2016
- Born: Phillipa Anne Soo; May 31, 1990 (age 36); Libertyville, Illinois, U.S.
- Education: Juilliard School (BFA)
- Occupations: Actress; singer
- Years active: 2012–present
- Spouse: Steven Pasquale (m. 2017)

Phillipa Anne Soo (/ˈfɪlɪpə ˈsuː/ FIL-ip-ə SOO; born May 31, 1990) is an American actress and singer. Known for her leading roles on Broadway primarily in musicals, she has received two Grammy Awards along with nominations for a Tony Award and a Primetime Emmy Award.

Soo gained prominence for originating the role of Eliza Hamilton in the musical Hamilton on Broadway. She earned a nomination for the 2016 Tony Award for Best Actress in a Musical and received a Grammy Award for Best Musical Theater Album that same year. Her performance was captured in the Disney+ live stage recording of Hamilton which was released in 2020 for which she earned a nomination for the Primetime Emmy Award for Outstanding Supporting Actress in a Limited Series or Movie at the 73rd Primetime Emmy Awards.

Soo's other Broadway credits include the title role of Amélie Poulain in Amélie (2017), Rebecca in The Parisian Woman (2017–18), Cinderella in Into the Woods (2022), and Guenevere in Camelot (2023). She also originated the role of Natasha Rostova in the Off-Broadway production of Natasha, Pierre & The Great Comet of 1812 (2012) as well as the role of suffragist Inez Milholland in Suffs (2022).

On film, Soo has appeared in the animated film Over the Moon (2020), the romantic comedy The Broken Hearts Gallery (2020), and the romantic dramedy One True Loves (2023), the later of which she also served as an executive producer. She made her television debut in the NBC series Smash in 2013. She later had leading roles in the CBS military drama The Code (2019) and in the ABC medical drama series Doctor Odyssey (2024) with supporting roles in the Hulu miniseries Dopesick (2021) and the Apple TV+ series Shining Girls (2022).

== Early life and education ==
Soo was born in Libertyville, Illinois, a suburb of Chicago. Her father is Chinese American (her paternal grandparents emigrated from China to the United States) and became a doctor. Her mother, who is from Southern Illinois, is involved in the arts.

Soo attended Libertyville High School from 2004 to 2008. She graduated from the Juilliard School's acting program in 2012.

== Career ==
=== 2012–2014: The Great Comet and early roles ===
After graduating from Juilliard in 2012, Soo was cast as Natasha Rostova in the Ars Nova production of Dave Malloy's Natasha, Pierre & The Great Comet of 1812, based on Leo Tolstoy's War and Peace. The show went on to transfer from Ars Nova to another Off-Broadway space, Kazino, a tent custom-built for the show. In 2013, Soo was cast in a small recurring role in the NBC television series Smash as the character Lexi. She appeared in five episodes in the second season before the show's cancellation. She had a small supporting role as Nia in the 2014 television pilot Dangerous Liaisons, but it did not get picked up to series.

=== 2015–2019: Stardom with Hamilton ===
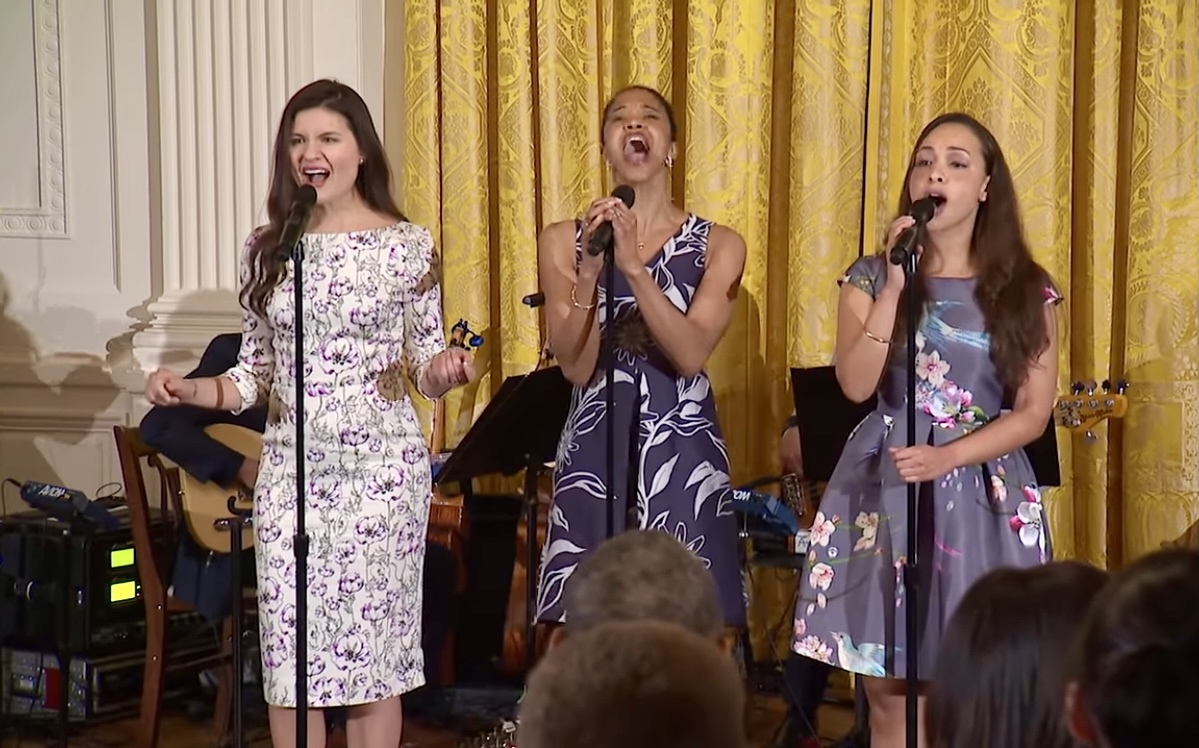
Soo (left) performs with Hamilton castmates at the White House (2016)

After seeing Soo's performance in Great Comet, director Thomas Kail and composer and writer Lin-Manuel Miranda asked her to take part in an early 2014 reading of the musical Hamilton, where she read the part of "Eliza" (Elizabeth Schuyler Hamilton). Soo played Eliza when the show premiered Off-Broadway at The Public Theater and on Broadway at the Richard Rodgers Theater. For her performance in Hamilton, Soo received a nomination for the Best Performance by an Actress in a Leading Role in a Musical at the 70th Tony Awards. Soo played her final performance in Hamilton on July 9, 2016, and the role of Eliza was taken over by Lexi Lawson. The production was captured in the Disney+ live stage recording of Hamilton which was released in 2020. The following year, she received a Primetime Emmy Award for Outstanding Supporting Actress in a Limited Series or Movie nomination at the 73rd Primetime Emmy Awards for her performance.

Soo played the titular character of Amélie Poulain in the pre-Broadway engagement of Amélie at the Ahmanson Theatre in Los Angeles from December 2016 to January 2017. Soo reprised her role when Amélie began preview performances on Broadway at the Walter Kerr Theatre on March 9, 2017, opening officially on April 3. The show closed on May 21, 2017. That same year, Soo returned on Broadway as Rebecca in The Parisian Woman, an original play by Beau Willimon. The production began preview performances at the Hudson Theatre on November 7, 2017, and opened on November 30 for a limited run through March 11, 2018. In 2018, it was announced that Soo had been cast in the CBS series The Code. The show aired for one season before its cancellation in July 2019.

=== 2020–present: Career expansion ===
In 2022, Soo portrayed suffragist Inez Milholland in Shaina Taub's musical Suffs. The production premiered Off-Broadway at The Public Theater to positive reviews. Entertainment Weekly declared, "Soo, best known for originating the role of Eliza Schuyler in Hamilton, grounds the story with her poignant voice, infusing Inez Milholland with emotion and vulnerability so striking, you're reminded of why she's so closely associated with another woman who wrote herself into the narrative." The production opened on April 6 and ran a limited run through May 29, 2022. Soo did not reprise her role when Suffs transferred to Broadway. On May 26, it was announced Soo would play Cinderella in the Broadway revival of Stephen Sondheim's Into the Woods at the St. James Theatre. Soo starred opposite Sara Bareilles, Brian D'Arcy James, Gavin Creel, Joshua Henry, Patina Miller, and Cheyenne Jackson. She received acclaim for her role, with The Hollywood Reporter critic David Rooney describing her performance as, "one of her best roles since her shattering performance as the original Eliza in Hamilton." She remained with the show through September 4, 2022. Soo would go on to win her second Grammy Award for Best Musical Theater Album at the 65th Annual Grammy Awards for her work in Into the Woods.

On August 2, 2022, it was announced that Soo would play Sarah Brown in a revival of Guys and Dolls at The Kennedy Center. The cast included Soo's husband, Steven Pasquale, as well as James Monroe Iglehart, Jessie Mueller, Rachel Dratch, and Kevin Chamberlin. In The New York Times article on the Best Theatre of 2022, Scott Heller praised Soo as "a gift to the musical theater" and that in that year she "showed more sides to her talent than ever". On November 1, 2022, it was announced Soo would star as Guenevere in the Broadway revival of the Lerner and Loewe musical Camelot opposite Andrew Burnap, and Jordan Donica. The production debuted in March 2023 at the Vivian Beaumont Theatre at Lincoln Center with Bartlett Sher as director and Aaron Sorkin with a revised book. For her performance she was nominated for the Drama League Award for Distinguished Performance.

In 2024, Soo was cast as Avery Morgan in ABC medical drama series Doctor Odyssey.

Soo co-wrote a children's book, Piper Chen Sings, with her sister-in-law Maris Pasquale Doran. The book was published by Random House Studio in 2024 and became a New York Times best seller. Soo played the role of Fox on the 2024 concept album Warriors by Lin-Manuel Miranda and Eisa Davis. In August 2025, Soo played Mary Magdalene in the concert revival of Andrew Lloyd Webber's rock musical Jesus Christ Superstar acting opposite Cynthia Erivo playing the titular role at the Hollywood Bowl. Soo has also narrated many of the novels written by Lily Chu, including The Stand-In, The Comeback, The Takedown, Drop Dead, and Rich Girl Summer.

== Philanthropy ==
Inspired by Elizabeth Schuyler Hamilton, the character she played in Hamilton, Soo started the Eliza Project initiative in partnership with Graham Windham, the first private orphanage in New York City that is mentioned in "Who Lives, Who Dies, Who Tells Your Story", the last song at the end of the show. Through the program, Soo plans to provide students at the Graham School with acting, dancing, and rap workshops. According to Soo, the core mission of "The Eliza Project" is "to use the arts as a means of expression, as an outlet for personal experience, and to uplift the creative spirit."

== Personal life ==
Soo became engaged to actor Steven Pasquale in February 2016. They married on September 24, 2017. In 2019, the two starred opposite each other in an episode of The Code. She has a dog named Billie, which she adopted for her 30th birthday in 2020. She and Pasquale practice Transcendental Meditation.

== Acting credits ==
Key
†	Denotes works that have not yet been released

=== Film ===
Year	Title	Role	Notes
2013	Keep The Change	Karen	Short film
2016	Moana	Additional voices	
2018	Here and Now	Oona	
2020	The One and Only Ivan	Thelma	Voice role
2020	The Broken Hearts Gallery	Nadine	
2020	Over the Moon	Chang'e	Voice role
2021	Tick, Tick... Boom!	"Sunday" Legend	Cameo appearance
2022	Blue's Big City Adventure	Audition Person #4	Cameo appearance
2023	One True Loves	Emma Blair	Also executive producer
TBA	Octet	Karly	Filming

=== Television ===
Year	Title	Role	Notes	Ref.
2013	Smash	Lexi	5 episodes	
2014	Dangerous Liaisons	Nia	Unaired pilot	
2019	The Code	Lieutenant Harper Li	Main cast (13 episodes)	
2020	Hamilton	Elizabeth Schuyler Hamilton	Disney+ special of the musical	
2021	The Bite	Cydni Estereo	Main cast (6 episodes)	
2021	Dopesick	Amber Collins	7 episodes	
2022	Shining Girls	Dr. Jin-Sook Gwansun	Main cast (8 episodes)	
2024–25	Doctor Odyssey	Avery Morgan	Main role	

=== Theatre ===
Year(s)	Production	Role	Location	Category	Ref.
2012	Natasha, Pierre & The Great Comet of 1812	Natasha Rostova	Ars Nova	Off-Off-Broadway	
2013–2014	Natasha, Pierre & The Great Comet of 1812	Natasha Rostova	Kazino	Off-Broadway	
2014	Hamilton	Eliza Schuyler Hamilton	The 52nd Street Project	Workshop	
2014	A Little Night Music	Anne Egerman	Berkshire Theatre Festival	Regional	
2014	Alice by Heart	Cheshire Cat / Tabatha / Caterpillar 2	Theatre Aspen	Workshop	
2014	The School for Wives	Agnes	Two River Theater Company	Regional	
2015	Hamilton	Eliza Schuyler Hamilton	The Public Theater	Off-Broadway	
2015–2016	Hamilton	Eliza Schuyler Hamilton	Richard Rodgers Theatre	Broadway	
2016–2017	Amélie	Amélie Poulain	Ahmanson Theatre	Los Angeles	
2017	Amélie	Amélie Poulain	Walter Kerr Theatre	Broadway	
2017–2018	The Parisian Woman	Rebecca	Hudson Theatre	Broadway	
2020	Tumacho	Catalina Vucovich-Villalobos	Connelly Theater	Off-Broadway	
2022	Suffs	Inez Milholland	The Public Theater	Off-Broadway	
2022	Into the Woods	Cinderella	St. James Theatre	Broadway	
2022	Guys and Dolls	Sister Sarah Brown	Kennedy Center	Regional	
2023	Camelot	Guenevere	Vivian Beaumont Theatre	Broadway	
2024	Gutenberg! The Musical!	The Producer (One night cameo)	James Earl Jones Theatre	Broadway	
2025	Jesus Christ Superstar	Mary Magdalene	The Hollywood Bowl	Los Angeles	
2026	High Spirits	Ruth Condomine	New York City Center	Encores!	

== Published works ==
- Piper Chen Sings (2024). ISBN 9780593564691.

== Awards and nominations ==
Year	Award	Category	Work	Result	Ref.
2013	Drama League Awards	Distinguished Performance	Natasha, Pierre & The Great Comet of 1812	Nominated	
2014	Lucille Lortel Awards	Outstanding Lead Actress in a Musical	Natasha, Pierre & The Great Comet of 1812	Nominated	
2015	Lucille Lortel Awards	Outstanding Lead Actress in a Musical	Hamilton	Won	
2016	Tony Awards	Best Actress in a Musical	Hamilton	Nominated	
2016	Grammy Awards	Best Musical Theater Album	Hamilton	Won	
2020	Critics' Choice Super Awards	Best Voice Actress in an Animated Movie	Over the Moon	Nominated	
2021	Primetime Emmy Awards	Outstanding Supporting Actress in a Limited Series or Movie	Hamilton	Nominated	
2023	Grammy Awards	Best Musical Theatre Album	Into the Woods	Won	
2023	Drama Desk Awards	Outstanding Featured Performance in a Musical	Into the Woods	Nominated	
2023	Broadway.com Audience Choice Awards	Favorite Featured Actress In A Musical	Into the Woods	Won	
2023	Drama League Awards	Distinguished Performance	Camelot	Nominated	
2023	Helen Hayes Award	Outstanding Performer in a Visiting Production	Guys and Dolls	Won	

== See also ==
- Chinese Americans in New York City
