= The Reynolds Pamphlet (song) =

Song by original Broadway cast of Hamilton

from the album Hamilton
- Released: 2015
- Genre: Show tune; hip hop
- Length: 2:08
- Songwriter: Lin-Manuel Miranda

Audio
- "The Reynolds Pamphlet" on YouTube

"The Reynolds Pamphlet" is the fourteenth song from Act 2 of the musical Hamilton, based on the life of Alexander Hamilton, which premiered on Broadway in 2015. Lin-Manuel Miranda wrote both the music and lyrics to the Reynolds pamphlet.

== Synopsis ==
The cover of the document usually referred to as the Reynolds pamphlet

The song refers to a 95-page document written by Alexander Hamilton, former Secretary of the Treasury, to defend his name in the wake of a sex scandal. Hamilton does so to protect himself from a major political threat, as Thomas Jefferson, James Madison and Aaron Burr are made aware by Hamilton of his adulterous actions after they accused him of speculation and misappropriation of Treasury funds. He then publishes the document to the public, proving that he did not abuse his Cabinet position for financial gain, but had been instead victim of blackmail by James Reynolds for his one-year affair with Reynolds's wife Maria Reynolds. Jefferson celebrates the news, as Hamilton's career has been sullied, which is a boon for the Democratic-Republican Party. The document causes Angelica Schuyler to return from London to support her sister, Hamilton's wife Eliza. Hamilton turns to Angelica for support, but she angrily rebukes him. The song concludes with all of the characters expressing sympathy for Eliza.

=== Historical differences ===
Although the musical Hamilton is based on true events, Miranda does use some dramatic license in retelling the story. In the case of the song "The Reynolds Pamphlet" the main differences are:

- Jefferson, Madison and Burr did not approach Hamilton about his affair, it was James Monroe, Frederick Muhlenberg and Abraham Venable in December 1792 when Hamilton was Treasury Secretary of the first Washington administration. They confronted him on the possible charge of speculation based on the accusations of both James and Maria Reynolds. Hamilton proved he was innocent of public wrongdoing by producing the letters by both Reynoldses proving his payments were related to blackmail over his one-year adulterous affair with Maria. Monroe was a close friend of Jefferson's and shared copies of the Reynoldses' letters with him. Burr may have been aware of Hamilton's affair with Maria Reynolds since he assisted her in divorcing from James in 1793 (when Maria's affair with Hamilton was already long ended) but never mentioned anything in this respect. In the early Summer of 1797, journalist James Callender broke the story of Hamilton's alleged speculation and infidelity. Hamilton blamed Monroe, and the altercation nearly ended in a duel. With nothing left to do, on August 25, 1797 Hamilton published the Reynolds pamphlet.
- Angelica's return from London precedes the Reynolds Pamphlet. After twelve years living in Britain, Angelica and husband John Barker Church returned to New York in May 1797, whereas the documents related to the scandal were first published by Callender that summer, with Hamilton announcing the Pamphlet in late July, and subsequent publication in August.

== Analysis ==
The song refers to the pamphlet penned by Alexander Hamilton in July 1797 (whose original title was Observations on Certain Documents), and the beginning of the song consists of Hamilton's opponents quoting from the document. The song further stands out from many others in the musical courtesy of its use of auto-tune, leading critics to consider it the most modern song on the album.

It also incorporates musical cues that point towards earlier songs in the musical, including "Satisfied".

== Critical reception ==
The Young Folks considered the song to be the 34th best in the musical, while a community post on BuzzFeed ranked the song 20th.

Huffington Post remarked that "the mash-up of previous tunes works well" and complimented the use of auto-tune.

== In popular culture ==
During his monologue while hosting Saturday Night Live, Lin-Manuel Miranda referenced the song.

Miranda also discussed the song and the eponymous document on an episode of Drunk History.
