= Say No to This =

Song in the musical "Hamilton"

Song by Leslie Odom Jr., Lin-Manuel Miranda, Jasmine Cephas Jones, Sydney James Harcourt, and the cast of Hamilton

from the album Hamilton
- Released: 2015
- Genre: R&B; soul; show tune
- Length: 4:03
- Songwriter: Lin-Manuel Miranda

Audio
- "Say No to This" on YouTube

"Say No to This" is the fourth song from Act 2 of the musical Hamilton, based on the life of Alexander Hamilton, which premiered on Broadway in 2015. Lin-Manuel Miranda wrote both the music and lyrics to the song. In this song, "Hamilton's eye begins wandering", as he has an affair with Maria Reynolds.

== Background ==
According to Slate, the song "began with a quote from LL Cool J's "I Need Love"", but due to clearance issues from Atlantic Records, "the line was removed before the show's transition to Broadway".

== Synopsis ==
The song outlines Alexander Hamilton's one-year adulterous affair with Maria Reynolds. Hamilton remains in New York City working on passing his plan for the creation of a national bank, his wife leaving to go on vacation upstate without him. While separated from his family, Hamilton is approached by Mrs. Reynolds, who claims her husband has abandoned her and asks Hamilton for financial aid before seducing him. Their adultery continues throughout the summer until Hamilton is contacted via letter by James Reynolds, who uses blackmail to coerce Hamilton to give him money for remaining silent about the affair. The affair and related blackmail later led to the first major political sex scandal in US history. The song is sung by Alexander Hamilton, Maria Reynolds, James Reynolds, and the show's company.

== Analysis ==
Vibe described the song as "a '90s slow jam, Usher-style". Screen Fellows deemed it "the best 90s slow jam R. Kelly never wrote". Musical director Alex Lacamoire noted that he used the cello to represent the character of Maria, and implements it in a "really snaky and sinister" fashion in this song.

The song includes a quotation from "Nobody Needs to Know", a song from the musical The Last Five Years which Miranda describes as "the ultimate infidelity jam."

== Critical reception ==
The Huffington Post wrote that the song includes "classic dude logic: I was crazy tired, so I had to cheat on my wife". Jezebel said that Maria Reynolds has "chilling, low vibrations" in this song. Monique Ocampo of Patheos praised the musical for not making Hamilton "Mister Perfect", noting that this song illustrates his "short-sightedness." Adam Gopnik of The New Yorker called the song "beautiful".

== Mixtape version ==
"Say Yes to This"

Song by Jill Scott, Leslie Odom Jr., Lin-Manuel Miranda, Sydney James Harcourt, and the cast of Hamilton

from the album The Hamilton Mixtape
- Released: 2016
- Genre: R&B; soul; show tune
- Length: 3:50
- Songwriter: Lin-Manuel Miranda

Audio
- "Say Yes to This" on YouTube

A revised version of the song was released on The Hamilton Mixtape in 2016. It was performed by Jill Scott, and tells the story of the Hamilton-Reynolds sex scandal from the perspective of Maria Reynolds, unlike in the original cast recording where Alexander Hamilton recounts the story. It incorporates the same backing vocals and music as the song from the musical.

== Certifications ==
Region	Certification	Certified units/sales
United Kingdom (BPI)	Silver	200,000^{‡}
United States (RIAA)	Platinum	1,000,000^{‡}
^{‡} Sales+streaming figures based on certification alone.
