= Betsy Struxness =

American actress

- Education: Juilliard School (BFA)
- Occupation: Actress
- Known for: Broadway performances, including Hamilton, Wicked, and Memphis

Betsy Struxness is an American actress known for her work on the Broadway stage.

Struxness received her BFA in dance from Juilliard School, before moving to New York.

After touring with the musical Oklahoma! and appearing in the ensemble of the tour of All Shook Up, Struxness appeared in the Ensemble and was understudying the role of Nessarose in the Chicago production of the musical Wicked. She was soon transferred to the San Francisco production and then to Broadway. Following her gig in Wicked she played the Double Dutch Girl in the Broadway musical Memphis, understudying the role of Mama. She also appeared on The Onion News Network in 2011 as an Applebee's customer.

Following this work, Struxness originated the roles of Angel of Mercy and Townsperson in the Broadway musical Leap of Faith in 2012, understudying the role of Sam. The production closed quickly, and later that same year she returned to Broadway in the ensemble of the new musical Scandalous: The Life and Trials of Aimee Semple McPherson. In 2013, she appeared in the ensemble in the original Broadway cast of Matilda, understudying the role of Mrs. Wormwood.

In 2014, after making a guest appearance on Louie as the character Sunshine, Struxness left Matilda and began working in the ensemble of the musical Hamilton. The show ran off-Broadway for five months in 2015, before transferring to Broadway. After several months in the production, she also became an understudy for the role of Angelica Schuyler. However, she was not featured among the cast in the 2020 feature film recording of the musical, as she departed the cast in March 2016, before the production was filmed. In 2017, she appeared on a stage adaptation of Shakespeare in Love as Viola.

Struxness is also a professional photographer.
