= James T. Callender =

Political journalist & pamphleteer

James Thomson Callender (1758 – July 17, 1803) was a political pamphleteer and journalist whose writing was controversial in his native Scotland and later, also in the United States. His revelations concerning George Washington, Alexander Hamilton, and later Thomas Jefferson, led to his marginalization politically. His contemporary reputation as a "scandalmonger" has overshadowed Callender's frequently perceptive analyses of revolutionary events. Callender campaigned against what he saw as the continued influence of monarchical ideas in American society, and claimed that Adams, Washington and Hamilton planned to impose a titled aristocracy and hereditary positions in the Senate and the Executive. In the United States, he was a central figure in the press wars between the Federalist and Democratic-Republican parties. After Jefferson won the presidency, Callender solicited employment as a postmaster, which was denied by Jefferson. Callender then published existing rumors claiming President Jefferson had children with slave Sally Hemings.

Self-educated, Callender worked as a recorder of deeds in Scotland when he began publishing satire. He turned to politics, some thought to sedition, in a pamphlet, The Political Progress of Britain, which caused a furor and led him to flee to the United States. He gained notoriety in Philadelphia in the 1790s with reportage and attacks on Alexander Hamilton. Subsequently, he was imprisoned under the Alien and Sedition Acts, and later turned against his one-time Democratic-Republican patrons. In 1803, he drowned, apparently falling in the James River due to intoxication – although there was some speculation among Federalists that his death may not have been an accident, as he was due to testify in a highly publicized trial later that month.

== Scotland ==
Callender was born in Scotland. He was not given a formal education but secured employment as a sub-clerk in the Edinburgh Sasine office, the equivalent of the Recorder of Deeds. While working in that office, Callender published satirical pamphlets criticizing the writer Samuel Johnson. "Deformities of Samuel Johnson", published anonymously, appealed to Scottish sentiments. Later he wrote pamphlets attacking political corruption. Callender's political writings were tinged with radical democratic egalitarianism, Scottish nationalism, and a pessimistic view of human nature. They were critical of the liberal notion of progress. An admirer of Jonathan Swift, Callender sought to cut the wealthy and the powerful down to size in his writing.

After clashes with his employers, Callender lost his job in the Sasine office. In 1791 Callender wrote a pamphlet criticizing an excise tax, paid for by the brewers who resented it. His writing attracted the attention of some reform-minded members of the Scottish nobility: Francis Garden, Lord Gardenstone, became his patron. In 1792 he published The Political Progress of Britain, a critique of war, imperialism, and corruption. He fled to Ireland and to the United States to avoid prosecution. After Callender left Scotland, Lord Gardenstone exposed him as the author; the journalist's reputation also was marred by the rumor that he had implicated Gardenstone.

== Philadelphia ==
Callender quickly gained a position as a Congressional reporter in Philadelphia and wrote anonymously for the partisan press. His first American article lambasted pro-war sentiment. Although he was frequently dogged by poverty and unemployment, by 1794 Callender was a regular freelance commentator on American politics and he would remain at the epicenter of the political life within the new nation until his death.

Over the next few years, while living by ghostwriting and piecemeal assignments, Callender became one of a group of radical Republican journalists who socialized together and held similar views on democracy and economic nationalism. During this period, he produced a series of pamphlets in which he attempted to frame a comprehensive political theory, advocating for the government's duty to the poor (in the form of progressive taxation), economic independence from Europe, and the promotion of native industry. These goals put him at odds with the Federalists as well as with some of the more conservative and agrarian Republicans.

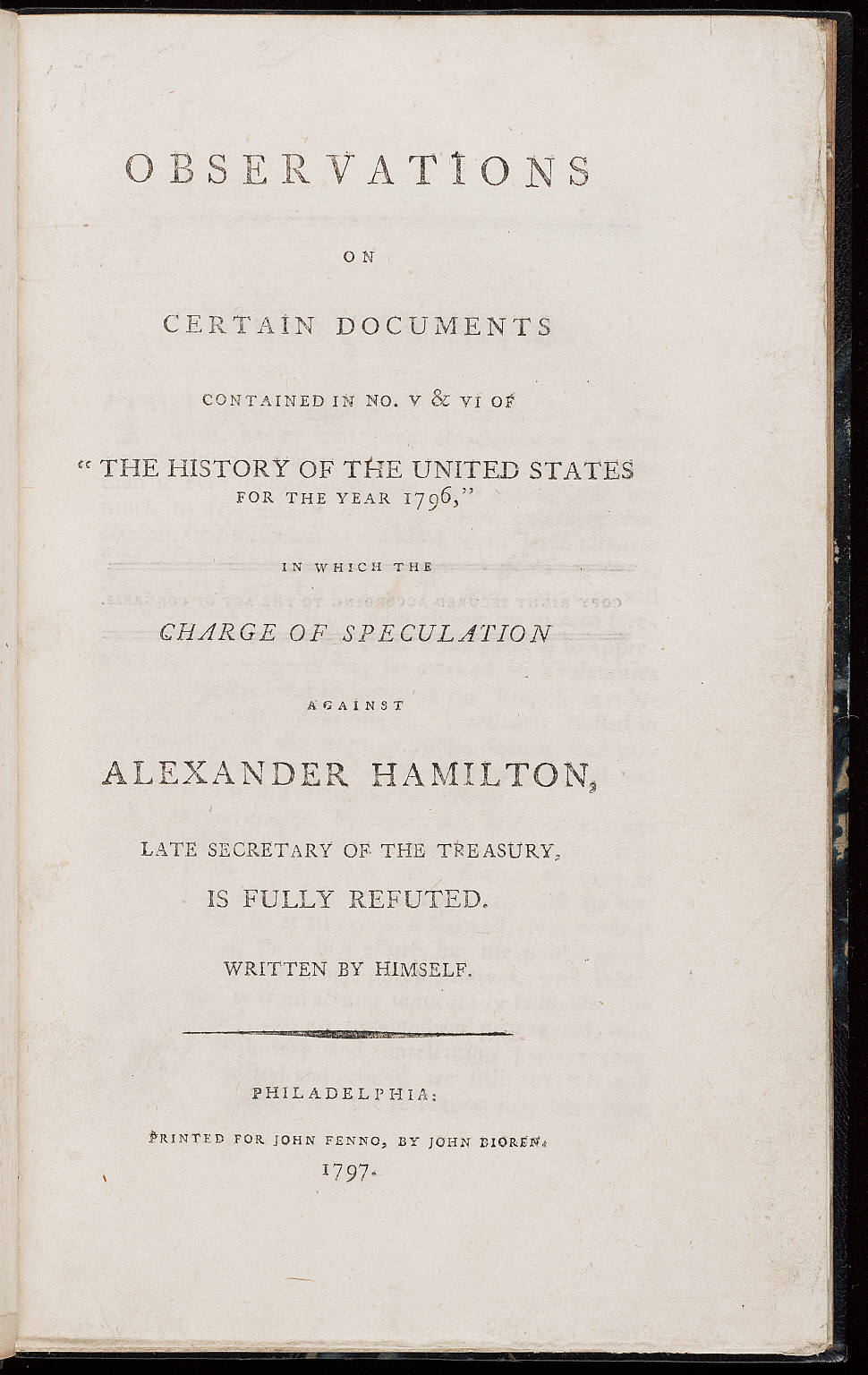
Title page, Observations of certain documents contained in no. V & VI of 'The history of the United States for the year 1796,' in which the charge of speculation against Alexander Hamilton, late secretary of the Treasury, is fully refuted. Written by himself. Printed at Philadelphia, 1797

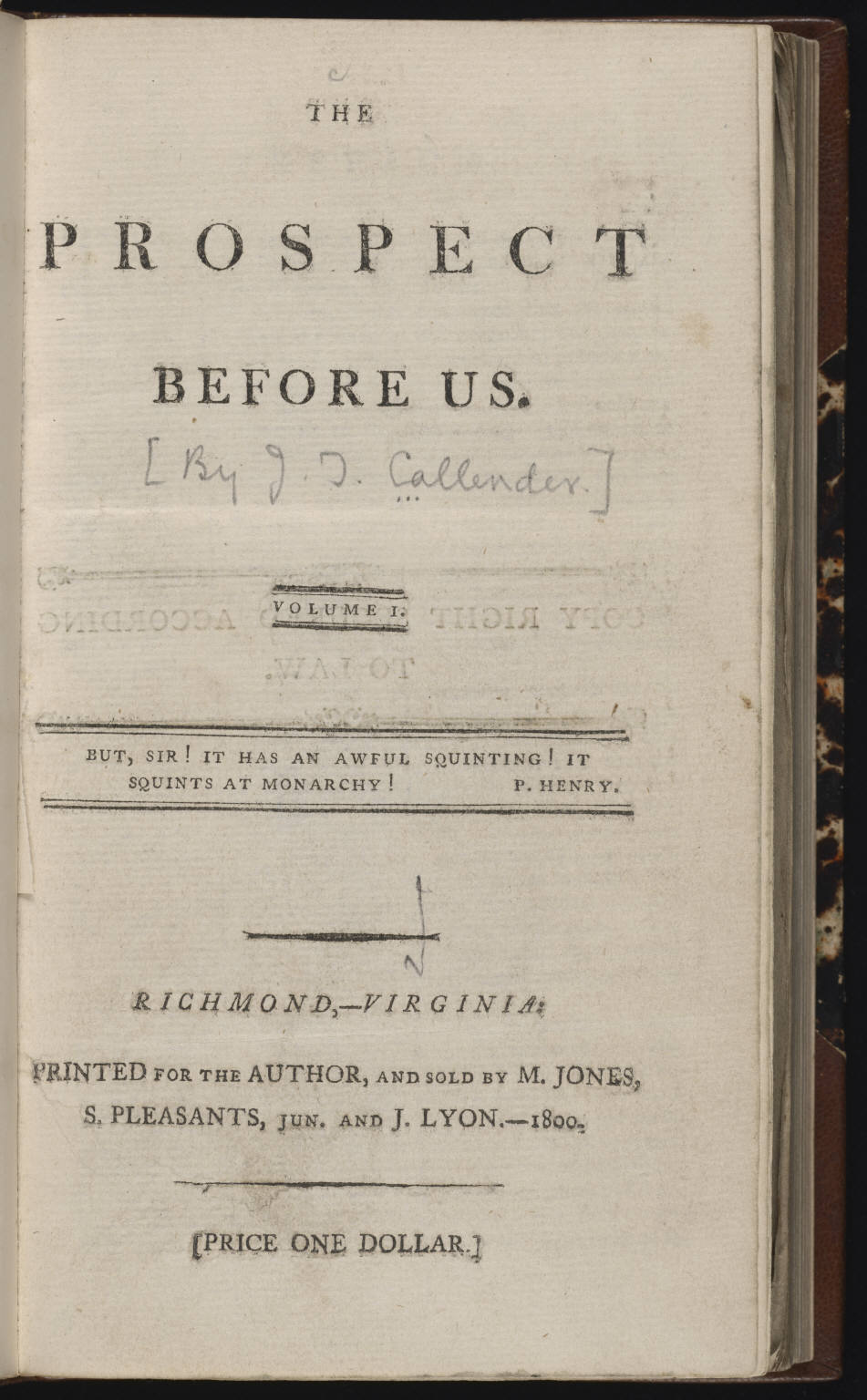
Title page, The Prospect Before Us, by James T. Callender, printed for the author by M. Jones, Jr., and J. Lyon, 1800

His writings attacked Federalist positions with a mix of reasoned argument, satire, and personal invective. His first pamphlet challenged the introduction of an excise tax into American commerce, but it was his invective against America's early national heroes – George Washington, John Adams, and Alexander Hamilton – and against their policies and failings, that gained him notoriety. In his pamphlet, A History of the United States for the Year 1796, published in installments in the late spring and early summer of 1797, he exposed the sexual relationship between Hamilton and a married woman, Maria Reynolds, and Hamilton's alleged financial corruption. Callender presented compelling evidence of adultery, but in the 1798 Sketches of the History of America, he wrote that the affair was a distraction from Hamilton's greater offense: partnering with Reynolds' husband in corrupt financial dealings. On August 25, 1797, Hamilton published his own pamphlet in response, later known as, The Reynolds Pamphlet, denying being a party to any improper financial matter, although he confessed to the adultery and proved that he had been victim of blackmail by James Reynolds over his adultery with Reynolds' wife rather than consorting with him in speculation. According to Callender, that was just a smokescreen. The financial charges were never proven, and after the scandal somewhat subsided, in 1798 President Adams appointed Hamilton for a new public office, Major General of the Continental Army.

Callender's success was short-lived. By 1798 his fortunes were in a downward spiral: he was forced to seek poor relief, his wife died of yellow fever, and his anonymously published political broadsides were exposed as his by a rival pamphleteer, William Cobbett, putting Callender in legal jeopardy and physical danger. He fled from Philadelphia to Virginia, leaving his children behind.

== Prosecution for sedition ==
Thomas Jefferson, impressed with Callender's attack on Hamilton, and eager to create a counterforce to the Federalist press, sought to use Callender's talents against John Adams. Subsequent to meeting him in Philadelphia, Jefferson supported Callender financially and provided feedback on early proofs of Callender's anti-Federalist pamphlet, The Prospect Before Us. Prior to the publication of the pamphlet, Callender was compelled to flee on foot from Philadelphia to Virginia, finding temporary refuge at the plantation of Senator Stevens Thomson Mason. This was due to his fleeing of the acts against him on sedition, after calling out Hamilton.

In Virginia, he completed The Prospect Before Us, whose subject was the pervasiveness of political corruption, particularly among Federalists and the Adams administration. His populist style had his targets permanently on the defensive. In June 1800, in retaliation for The Prospect, Callender was prosecuted under the Alien and Sedition Act by the Adams administration. His trial was presided over by Supreme Court Justice Samuel Chase, who later was impeached, in part for his handling of the Callender trial. Callender was fined $200 and received the longest jail term of the journalists prosecuted under the Sedition Act. He was released on the last day of the Adams administration, in March 1801. After his release, Callender and the others who had been prosecuted were pardoned by the new president, Thomas Jefferson.

== Attacks on Thomas Jefferson ==
Out of jail, Callender asked Jefferson to appoint him Postmaster of Richmond, Virginia, warning that if Jefferson did not, there would be consequences. Callender believed erroneously that Jefferson was conspiring to deprive him of money owed to him by the government after the pardon, and that Jefferson did not appreciate his sacrifices. Jefferson refused to make the appointment, as placing the ill-tempered Callender in a position of authority in the Federalist stronghold of Richmond would have been, in the words of the Jefferson biographer R.B. Bernstein, "like whacking a hornet's nest with a stick."

With his career and his social ambitions thwarted, Callender returned to newspaper work, as editor of a Federalist newspaper, the Richmond Recorder. In a series of articles attacking corruption on all sides, Callender targeted Jefferson, revealing that Jefferson had funded his pamphleteering. After denials were issued, he published Jefferson's letters to him to prove the relationship. Later, angered by the criticism from Jefferson supporters, who asserted that Callender had abandoned his wife to die of a venereal disease, Callender reported in a series of articles that Jefferson fathered children by his slave Sally Hemings. The first of those articles, printed on September 1, 1802, contained this excerpt:

It is well known that the man, Whom it delighteth the people to honor, keeps and for many years has kept, as his concubine, one of his slaves. Her name is Sally. The name of her eldest son is Tom. His features are said to bear a striking though sable resemblance to those of the President himself. The boy is ten or twelve years of age.

Callender's reporting on the Jefferson-Hemings relationship used racist rhetoric of the time. Although he had expressed anti-slavery views when he first arrived in the United States, he eventually adopted a position on slavery and race similar to that of Jefferson's in Notes on the State of Virginia. After the Hemings controversy ran its course, Callender turned to publicizing Jefferson's earlier attempt to seduce a married neighbor decades before.

== Death ==
By some accounts, Callender was slated to provide testimony for a New York trial, The People v. Croswell, which involved libel charges against a publisher, Harry Croswell, who had reprinted claims that Thomas Jefferson paid Callender to defame George Washington. Croswell's lawyer was Alexander Hamilton. Jefferson, wary of the controversy generated by the Adams administration's sedition prosecutions, had begun a selective campaign against individual newspaper critics.

Despite his popularity among newspaper readers, Callender had an uneasy situation. Former allies had turned against him. In a surprise attack in December 1802, George Hay, one of his former defense attorneys, clubbed him in the head with a walking stick in retaliation for an article about an international incident to which Hay had ties.

In 1802, Meriwether Jones, who was a friend and supporter of Thomas Jefferson and James Callender, had published an open letter to Callender:

The James River you tell us has suffered to cleanse your body; is there any menstrum [solvent] capable of cleansing your mind... Oh! could a dose of James river, like Lethe, have blessed you with forgetfulness, for once you would have neglected your whiskey.

In 1803, Callender's children joined him in Richmond, perhaps removed from Philadelphia due to the Jefferson controversy; he had a falling out with the owner of the Richmond Recorder over money. In March, the offices of the newspaper were attacked by young Republicans from Hay's law firm. One week after the People v. Croswell trial began, Callender drowned on July 17, 1803, in three feet of water in the James River, reportedly too drunk to save himself.

== Legacy ==
In 1990, the Australian writer Michael Durey published a biography covering Callender's life. Durey noted that Callender's then-reputation as a liar, drunkard, and scandalmonger had been uncritically based on the original attacks against Callender by his political targets and rivals in the press. He believed their attacks obscured Callender's message of democratic egalitarianism, his relevance to the early formation of Republican politics, and his role in the birth of political journalism.

In 1997, the historian Annette Gordon-Reed published Thomas Jefferson and Sally Hemings: An American Controversy, showing in detail how historians had traditionally discounted some of the evidence supporting the allegations of Jefferson's paternity of slave children. In 1998, a DNA analysis confirmed that Eston Hemings Jefferson's descendants were related to the Jefferson male line. Together with the historical evidence, the biographers Joseph Ellis and Andrew Burstein, as well the National Genealogical Society, published their conclusions that Jefferson had a long-term relationship and several children by Sally Hemings. In 2010 Gordon-Reed won a MacArthur Fellowship for "dramatically chang[ing] the course of Jeffersonian scholarship."

In 2000, the journalist and author William Safire published a historical novel, Scandalmonger, about Callender's life in the United States that was based on letters of notable people of the time, including presidents Washington, Adams, Jefferson, Madison, and Monroe. Forty-four pages at the end of the hardcover edition of the book are what Safire calls "the underbook", a section distinguishing the historical information from fiction and including notes and sources.

In 2008, Kerwin Swint of CNN labeled Callender a "hatchet man" and credits his smearing of Adams as the critical factor that gave the presidency to Jefferson.

== See also ==
- Jefferson–Hemings controversy
