= Lexi Lawson =

American actress and singer

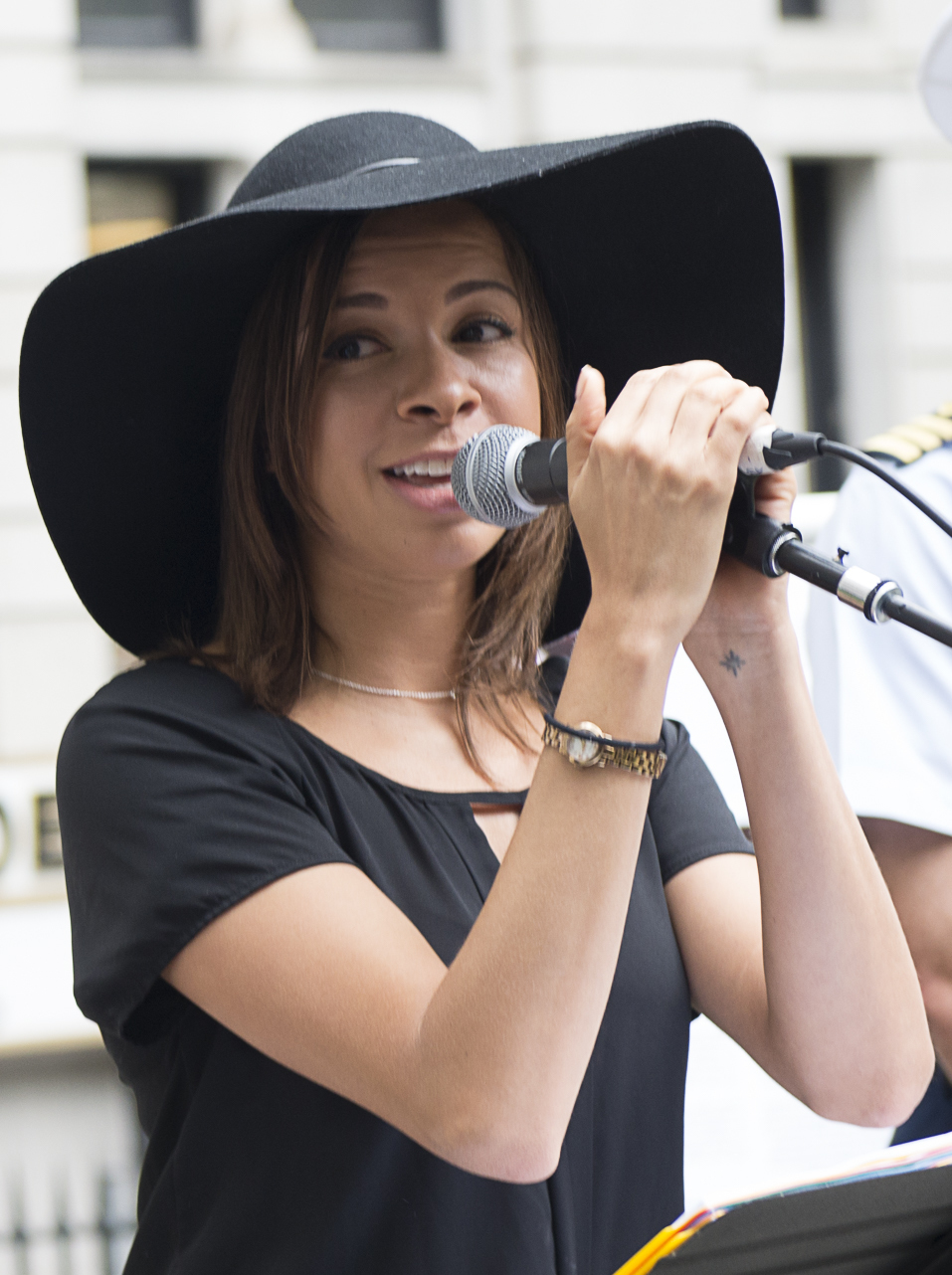
- Lawson in 2017
- Born: The Bronx, New York City
- Occupations: Actress, singer
- Years active: 2007–present

Lexi Lawson is an American actress and singer, best known for her work in musicals. She held the lead female roles in touring productions of Rent and In the Heights. Lawson made her Broadway debut as Eliza Hamilton in Hamilton.

== Early life ==
Lexi Lawson was born and raised in the Bronx in New York City. As a child she moved with her family to Newburgh, New York. She graduated from Newburgh Free Academy in 2002.

== Career ==
In 2010 she joined the touring company of Rent when she was cast as Mimi Marquez for the North American tour. She had become a finalist on the eighth season of American Idol but chose to drop out in order to tour with Rent. Shortly prior to her contract coming to an end, she expressed an interest in the role of Vanessa in Lin-Manuel Miranda's musical In the Heights. She was subsequently cast in the part in the United States national tour.

Lawson made her Broadway debut when she was announced as replacing Phillipa Soo in the role of Eliza Hamilton in Miranda's Hamilton. Her first performance took place on July 9, 2016. On February 12, 2017, she joined with other former cast members of Rent to perform a tribute to the musical entitled "Seasons of Love" at The Cutting Room in New York City.

Lawson recorded the single "The Christmas Song (Chestnuts Roasting on an Open Fire)", which was released in December 2017. That same month, she was present for the unveiling of the restored bust of Alexander Hamilton at the Museum of the City of New York alongside fellow cast member Anthony Lee Medina. She teamed up with four other Eliza actresses from Hamilton productions on Miranda's Hamildrops in 2018. The track, "First Burn", featured Lawson along with Julia K. Harriman, Shoba Narayan, Rachelle Ann Go, and Arianna Afsar. Miranda explained on Twitter that the song was the original version of a song sung by Eliza in the musical.

== Personal life ==
Lawson is married to actor Leonidas Gulaptis; they have one child together. She owns a Yorkshire Terrier. She bought the dog from a breeder in 2008, and would take it with her as she toured the US on the productions of Rent and In The Heights.

== Theatre credits ==
Year(s)	Production	Role	Location	Category
2009–10	Rent	Mimi Marquez	North America	National tour
2010–11	In The Heights	Vanessa	United States	National tour
2016–18	Hamilton	Eliza Hamilton	Richard Rodgers Theatre	Broadway

== Filmography ==
Year	Title	Role	Notes
2007	Tonight's the Nite	Band leader	TV talk show, 1 episode
2009	Ghosts of Girlfriends Past	Wedding singer	
2012	What Would You Do?	Lexi	TV series, 1 episode
2012	You're Nobody 'til Somebody Kills You	Beautiful girl	
2013	The Mentalist	Rose Salas	TV series, 1 episode
2014	Sanjay and Craig	Pop Song Vocalist (Voice)	TV series, 1 episode
2017–18	Power	Olivia Gorman	TV series, 3 episodes
2019	Always and Forever Christmas	Lucy	TV movie
2023	Blue Bloods	Dana Carter	TV series, 1 episode
