= Isabella Graham =

Scottish-American philanthropist and educator

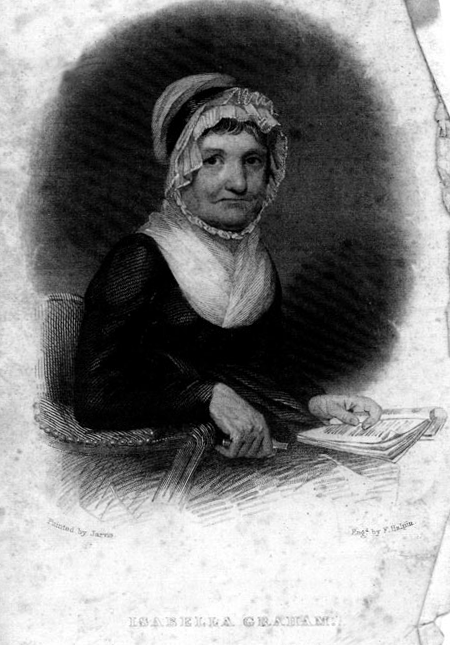
Isabella Graham

Isabella Graham (née Marshall; July 29, 1742 - July 27, 1814) was a Scottish-American philanthropist and educator.

== Early life ==
Graham was born on July 29, 1742, in Lanarkshire, Scotland. She was the only daughter of Janet (née Hamilton) and John Marshall, a landowner. She grew up on an estate at Elderslie, near Paisley. With money from a legacy left by her grandfather she attended the boarding school of Betty Morehead for seven years. The Graham family was known for their piety and Isabella became a communicant of the Church of Scotland at the age of seventeen at the Laigh Kirk, Paisley where Dr. John Witherspoon, who was later a signatory to the United States Declaration of Independence, was the minister.

== Personal life ==
In 1765, she married Dr. John Graham, an army surgeon in the Royal Americans regiment. Two years later, she went with him to Canada. They had three daughters and two sons, one of whom died in infancy in Scotland. The surviving children were Jessie, Joanna Bethune, Isabella and John. Her husband was ordered to Antigua and she traveled there with him, her children, and two indigenous girls. On November 17, 1774, John Graham became ill with fever and died on November 22, 1774. She would never remarry and would from then on wear the clothes of a widow. Pregnant with her fifth child at the time of her husband's death, she chose to return to Scotland with her children. After the birth of her son, Graham struggled to provide for her children as well as her elderly father. As a way to care for her family, she opened a small school in Paisley and later a boarding school for young ladies in Edinburgh.

While visiting Scotland from America in 1785, Dr. John Witherspoon spoke with Isabella regarding returning to the United States. After her children had completed their schooling, she departed for New York in July 1789 to help prepare the United States for its role as "the country where the Church of Christ would eventually flourish" and later that year established a school for young women.

While living in America, Graham was a member of the New York Society Library along with many of the nation's founding fathers and other influential individuals of the time. She is the only woman who is listed under members with a political occupation within the site's database. Although her borrowing history at the library spans only four months, Graham checked out thirteen books during that period. The records of her borrowing history demonstrate her interests in historical and biographical works, as well as novels and travel diaries.

== Philanthropy ==
Earlier in her life in Scotland, Graham founded the Penny Society, later known as the Society for the Relief of the Destitute Sick, a friendly society for poor members, who contributed a penny a week to create a fund for providing for them when sick. This organization was the beginning of a life dedicated to philanthropy. Graham established the Society for the Relief of Poor Widows in 1797. The Society for Relief of Poor Widows with Small Children was one of the first women's societies to engage in active public benevolence and successfully petitioned for shares of public welfare funds. She retired from teaching in 1798 to devote herself completely to philanthropic work.

Throughout her life, Graham also founded, or helped organize, the Orphan Asylum Society (organized 1806), the Society for Promoting Industry among the Poor, and the first Sunday School for Ignorant Adults in New York. She also aided in organizing the first missionary society and the first monthly missionary prayer meeting in the city; was the first president of the Magdalen Society of New-York (founded 1812); systematically visited the inmates of the hospital, and the sick female convicts in the state prison; and distributed Bibles to hundreds of families, as well as tracts prepared under her own direction. She believed that cultivating piety and Christian morality was the key to lifting widows out of poverty.

== Legacy ==
Graham's memoir, The Power of Faith: Exemplified in the Life and Writings of Mrs. Isabella Graham published in 1822 is available in interactive digital copy.
