= Hamilton–Reynolds affair =

Sex scandal in early United States history

Alexander Hamilton at around the time of the scandal, 1792

The Hamilton–Reynolds affair was the first major sex scandal in United States political history. It involved Secretary of the Treasury Alexander Hamilton, who conducted an affair with Maria Reynolds from 1791 to 1792, during the presidency of George Washington. After he discovered the affair, Reynolds' husband, James Reynolds, blackmailed Hamilton, who paid him over $1,300 in hush money, about a third of his annual income. In 1797, Hamilton publicly admitted to the affair after his political enemies accused him of financial corruption during his time as the Treasury Secretary. Hamilton responded by writing, "The charge against me is a connection with one James Reynolds for purposes of improper pecuniary speculation. My real crime is an amorous connection with his wife, for a considerable time with his privity and connivance."

James Monroe was among the first men to be informed of this scandal, and he leaked information about it to Thomas Jefferson. Jefferson used the information to start rumors about Hamilton's private life. In 1797, Hamilton and Monroe challenged each other to a duel over this incident. The duel was averted by the intercession of Aaron Burr, who ironically would kill Hamilton in a duel a few years later in 1804.

== Background ==
In the summer of 1791, 23-year-old Maria Reynolds allegedly approached the married 34-year-old Alexander Hamilton in Philadelphia to request his help and financial aid by claiming that her husband, James, had abandoned her. Hamilton did not have any money on him, so he retrieved her address to deliver the funds in person. Once Hamilton arrived at the boarding house at which Maria was lodging, she brought him upstairs and led him into her bedroom. He later recounted, "I took the bill out of my pocket and gave it to her. Some conversation ensued from which it was quickly apparent that other than pecuniary consolation would be acceptable." The two began an illicit affair that would last, with varying frequency, until approximately June 1792.

Over the course of those months, while the affair took place, James Reynolds was well aware of his wife's unfaithfulness. He continually supported their relationship to gain regular blackmail money from Hamilton.

In the Reynolds Pamphlet, Hamilton goes as far as to argue that James Reynolds, along with his wife, had conspired the scheme to "extort money from me." The common practice in the day was for the wronged husband to seek retribution in a pistol duel, but Reynolds, realizing how much Hamilton had to lose if the activity came into public view, insisted on monetary compensation instead. After Hamilton had shown unequivocal signs that he wanted to end the affair in autumn 1791, Hamilton received two letters on December 15, 1791, one each from Mrs. and Mr. Reynolds. The first letter, from Maria, warned of her husband's knowledge and of James' attempting to blackmail Hamilton. By then, Hamilton discontinued the affair and briefly ceased to visit, but both James and Maria were apparently involved in the blackmailing scheme, as both sent letters inviting Hamilton to continue his visits. After extorting $1000 in exchange for secrecy over Hamilton's adultery, James Reynolds rethought his request for Hamilton to cease his relationship with Maria and wrote inviting him to renew his visits "as a friend," only to extort forced "loans" after each visit, which the most-likely-colluding Maria solicited with her letters. By May 2, 1792, James changed his mind again and requested for Hamilton to stop seeing his wife but not before James had received additional payment. In the end, the blackmail payments totaled over $1,300 including the initial extortion (equivalent to ≈$43,000 in 2024).

Hamilton had possibly become aware of both Reynoldses being involved in the blackmail and both welcomed and strictly complied with James' request to end the affair.

== Scandal ==
In November 1792, after James Reynolds was jailed for participation in a scheme involving unpaid back wages intended for Revolutionary War veterans, he used his own knowledge about Hamilton's sex affair to bargain his way out of his own troubles. Reynolds knew that Hamilton would have to choose between revealing his affair with Maria or falsely admitting complicity to the charges. James Monroe, Abraham Venable, and Frederick Muhlenberg were the first men to hear of this possible corruption within the nation's new government, and on December 15, 1792, they decided to confront Hamilton personally with the information that they had received, supported by the notes of Hamilton's payments to Reynolds that Maria had given them to corroborate her husband's accusations.

Denying any financial impropriety, Hamilton revealed the true nature of his relationship with the Reynoldses in all of its unsavory details. He turned over the letters from both of them.

Observations on Certain Documents Contained in No. V & VI of "The History of the United States for the Year 1796," In which the Charge of Speculation Against Alexander Hamilton, Late Secretary of the Treasury, is Fully Refuted, commonly referred to as The Reynolds Pamphlet

Apparently convinced that Hamilton was not guilty of the charge of public misconduct, Monroe, Venable, and Muhlenberg agreed not to make public the information and documents on the Reynolds Affair. Monroe and his colleagues assured Hamilton that the matter was settled. However, Monroe sent the letters to his close personal friend, Thomas Jefferson. Jefferson and Hamilton were self-described nemeses, and five years after receiving the letters, Jefferson used the knowledge to start rumors about Hamilton's private life.

Also in 1797, when Hamilton no longer held the post of Secretary of the Treasury, the details of his relationship with Maria and James Reynolds came to light in a series of pamphlets authored by the journalist James Thomson Callender. Included were copies of the documents that Hamilton had furnished to the Monroe commission in December 1792.

Hamilton confronted Monroe over the leakage of the supposedly confidential documents. Monroe denied any responsibility. Hamilton came very close to calling Monroe a liar, and Monroe retorted that Hamilton was a scoundrel and challenged him to a duel. The duel was averted by the intercession of Aaron Burr. After writing a first draft in July 1797, on August 25, Hamilton responded to Callender's revelations by printing his own 95-page pamphlet, Observations on Certain Documents, later known as the "Reynolds Pamphlet," in which he denied all charges of corruption. However, he openly admitted his relationship with Maria Reynolds and apologized for it.

While his candor was admired, the affair severely damaged his reputation. While Hamilton's admitted affair served to confirm Jefferson's conviction that he was untrustworthy, it did nothing to change Washington's opinion of him, who still held him in "very high esteem" and still viewed him as the dominant force in establishing the federal law and government.

== Cultural reception ==
Hamilton was the youngest of the major American founders, and his involvement in a sex scandal and relatively early death made his life story seem tragically romantic to some admirers and biographers, such as Henry Cabot Lodge, whose 1882 biography concludes Hamilton "was evidently very attractive", or Gertrude Atherton, whose 1902 historical fiction novel The Conqueror calls Hamilton "beautiful to look upon". The first movie depicting Hamilton's life was a 1918 silent film about his affair with Maria Reynolds titled The Beautiful Mrs. Reynolds. The 2000 novel Scandalmonger by William Safire portrays Maria Reynolds being intimate with both Burr and Hamilton, contrasting the characters by describing Burr as a clinical lover and Hamilton as passionate.

The affair serves as a central plot point in Act 2 of Lin-Manuel Miranda's 2015 biographical musical Hamilton. Hamilton becomes involved in the affair with Reynolds in the song "Say No to This", and his political opponents accuse him of fiscal corruption—prompting him to defend himself by saying the financial transactions were actually hush money for a sex scandal—in "We Know". In the show, Burr, Jefferson, and James Madison confront Hamilton, replacing Monroe, Venable, and Muhlenberg. Hamilton decides to prove his innocence of financial misdeeds by publicly acknowledging the scandal in "Hurricane" (the musical leaving out Callender and his pamphlets so that Hamilton seems to be preempting accusations rather than responding to them) and in doing so destroys his political career in "The Reynolds Pamphlet" (although in history, Hamilton's political career did not truly end until he published a pamphlet criticizing John Adams, which ended up destroying the Federalist Party). The following song "Burn" narrates his wife Eliza's grief over her husband's infidelity.

== See also ==
- List of federal political sex scandals in the United States

== Sources ==
- Ferling, John (2013). Jefferson and Hamilton: The Rivalry That Forged a Nation. Bloomsbury Press. ISBN 978-1608195428.
- Freeman, Joanne B. (2002). Affairs of Honor: National Politics in the New Republic. Yale University Press. ISBN 978-0300097559.
- Hamilton, Caroline V. (February 2011). "The Erotic Charisma of Alexander Hamilton". Journal of American Studies. 45 (1): 1–19. JSTOR 23016756.
- Isenberg, Nancy (2007). Fallen Founder: The Life of Aaron Burr. Penguin Books.
- Keyes, Cheryl L. (2021). "Long Live Hip-Hop: Hamilton and the Death (and Rebirth) of Hip-Hop". In Lodge, Mary Jo; Laird, Paul R. (eds.). Dueling Grounds: Revolution and Revelation in the Musical Hamilton. Oxford University Press. pp. 183–199. doi:10.1093/oso/9780190938840.003.0013. ISBN 9780190938840.
- Madison, Katherine S. (Spring–Summer 2017). "'Who Lives, Who Dies, Who Tells Your Story: The Use and Representation of Records in Hamilton: An American Musical". American Archivist. 80 (1): 53–81. doi:10.17723/0360-9081.80.1.53.
- Mazzeo, Tilar (2018). Eliza Hamilton: The Extraordinary Life and Times of the Wife of Alexander Hamilton. Simon & Schuster. ISBN 978-1501166303.
- Wheelan, Joseph (2005). Jefferson's Vendetta. Carroll & Graf. ISBN 9780786714377.
- Wolf, Stacy (2021). "Hamilton's Gendered Entanglements". In Lodge, Mary Jo; Laird, Paul R. (eds.). Dueling Grounds: Revolution and Revelation in the Musical Hamilton. Oxford University Press. pp. 73–87. doi:10.1093/oso/9780190938840.003.0006. ISBN 9780190938840.
