= Joanna Bethune =

Philanthropist and educator (1770–1860)

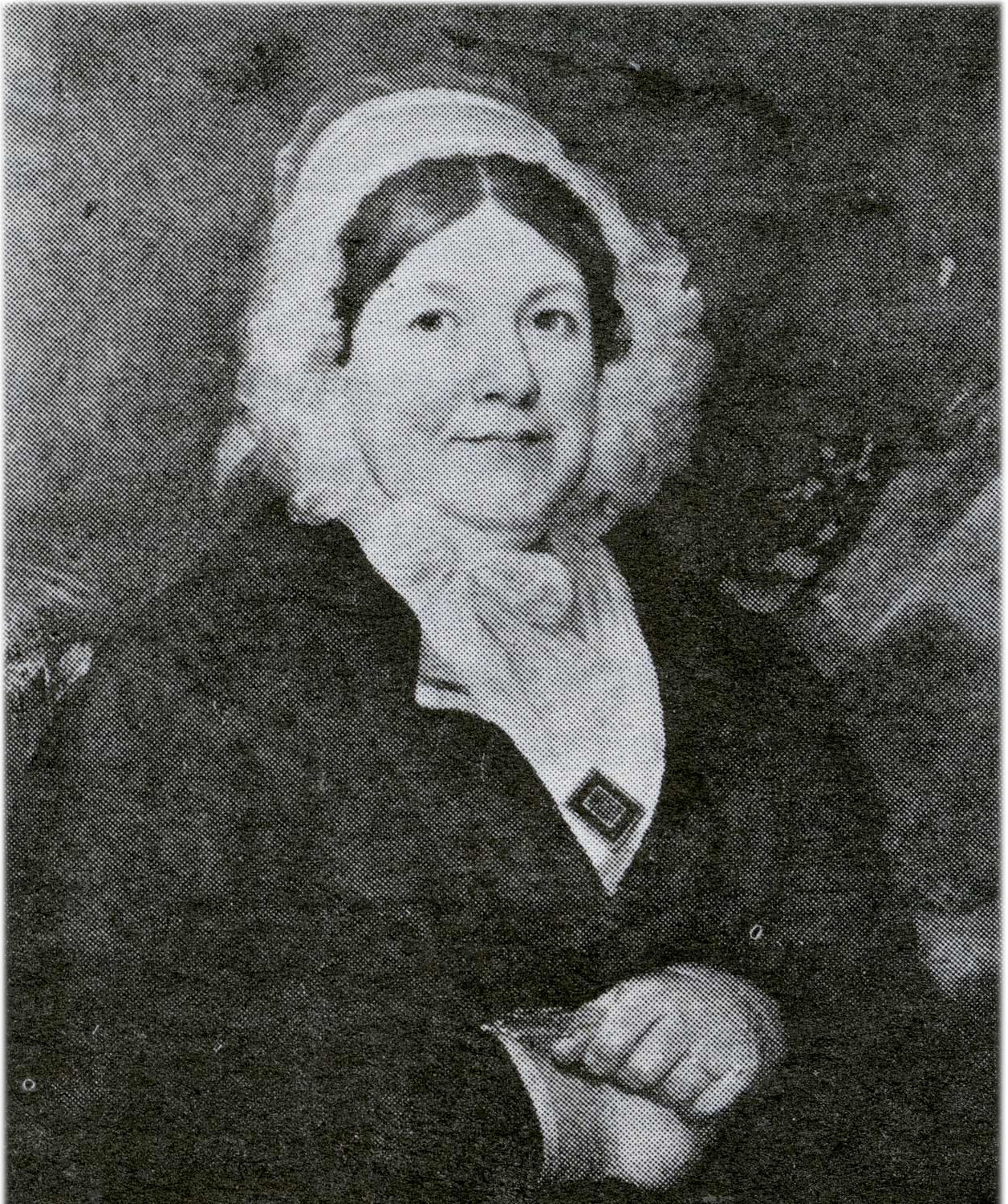
Joanna Graham Bethune was a social reformer in the United States. She is regarded as the mother of the Sunday School movement and founded several charitable institutions for orphans.

Joanna Bethune (February 1, 1770 – July 29, 1860) was a Scottish-Canadian philanthropist, educator, and founder of various charitable organizations in the 19th century. She was responsible for the growth of philanthropic organizations focused on helping women and children in the first half of the 19th century, many of which were highly successful and trained thousands of students.

== Early life ==
Joanna Graham Bethune was born to Isabella and Dr. John Graham at Fort Niagara on February 1, 1770, in Canada. After Dr. Graham's death in 1773, Bethune moved with her family to Scotland, where she was raised by her mother. Bethune attended school at Paisley and Edinburgh until she was thirteen years old when a friend of her mother paid for her to attend a French school in Rotterdam for two years. After studying to become a teacher, she moved with her family once again to New York where she became a teacher at her mother's school at the age of 19.

== Personal life ==
Bethune was a deeply religious Christian, having been a member of the Cedar Street Presbyterian Church. She took her religious duties so seriously as to reject the proposal of a man who criticized her for "excessive" church attendance. Under her mother's suggestion, she married a Scottish merchant named Divie Bethune, a man who at first was broke upon entering New York but over time gained considerable wealth. Like Joanna, Divie was also a devout Christian.

After her marriage, Bethune turned her focus to charity work. She had helped her mother start the Society for the Relief of Poor Widows with Small Children which was her earliest work as a philanthropist. With her husband's financial backing she was able to start her own organizations for helping needy children. Divie continued to encourage and back Joanna up in her pursuit to create and run charities and schools throughout their marriage. The couple had six children together, three of whom lived to adulthood: Jessie, Isabella, and George. Before her death, Bethune's mother asked her daughter to focus her efforts on helping children and to "leave the work with widows to others".

Bethune's husband died on September 18, 1824, and Bethune died on July 29, 1860.

== Organizations founded and their achievements ==
=== Orphan Asylum Society ===
After seeing the poor conditions and standards in the almshouses that children were often sent to, Bethune suggested the idea of creating a shelter to nurture and educate children. With her husband's support and financial backing, she helped found the Orphan Asylum Society, with its own standards of taking care of children. The major goal of the Society was to provide a safe, clean living environment for the orphans and to educate them to be ready to work hard to contribute to society as adults. The Society was highly successful in training orphaned children for jobs and it had a positive response from the public. The New York State gave financial aid to the society and led it to becoming a prime example for charitable organizations, inspiring the creation of other charities.

=== Infant School Society ===
In July 1827, Bethune opened New York's first infant school. She became the supervisor of the Infant School Society and worked to teach younger children.

=== Society for the Relief of Poor Widows with Small Children ===
Bethune helped her mother open and run this organization though her mother later told to her to focus on children instead of widows.

=== Federal Union Society For the Promotion of Sabbath Schools ===
Divie Bethune inspired his wife to gather other women to form a system of Sunday schools modeled after the ones in England after being turned down by local ministers. Divie Bethune said, "My dear wife, there is no use in waiting for the men; do you gather a few ladies of different denominations, and begin the work yourselves". The Federal Union Society For the Promotion of Sabbath Schools was established and Bethune became the administrator. This Society was successful just like the Orphan Asylum Society had been; producing twenty-one schools with over eight thousand students. Later on, the New York Sunday School Union (a union made up of men) integrated the Society and Bethune eventually lost her position as the leader.

=== Society for the Promotion of Industry Among the Poor ===
In 1814, Bethune initiated the Society for the Promotion of Industry Among the Poor to give work to people suffering from the struggles brought on by the War of 1812. The Society gave jobs to 500 women.
