= History Has Its Eyes on You =

Song in the musical "Hamilton"

Song by original Broadway cast of Hamilton

from the album Hamilton
- Released: 2015
- Genre: Show tune
- Length: 1:37
- Songwriter: Lin-Manuel Miranda

Audio
- "History Has Its Eyes on You" on YouTube

"History Has Its Eyes on You" is the nineteenth song from Act 1 of the musical Hamilton, based on the life of Alexander Hamilton, which premiered on Broadway in 2015. Lin-Manuel Miranda wrote both the music and lyrics to the song. George Washington recounts to Hamilton the story of his first command, and his fears that history will judge him harshly for his actions.

== Synopsis ==
The song begins after Hamilton has been promoted by George Washington to a command position in the Continental Army. Washington tells Hamilton the story of his first command, when his ineptitude led to a massacre of his men. Washington reveals his deep regret over this failure, his fear that history is both judging his actions and will hold him in contempt for his mistakes. Hamilton is told that because of his increasingly important role in the events of the war, history will now be judging his actions in the same vein as Washington's.

== Analysis ==
This song reveals Washington's inner struggle, and his conflict with the fact that he has no control over his legacy or how he is remembered.

When Hamilton is told that history will be watching him, it symbolizes that Hamilton is becoming a significant part of the narrative of the war and of the early history of America.

The melody for this song is repeated in the opening chords of the final song of Hamilton, "Who Lives, Who Dies, Who Tells Your Story".

== Reception ==
A community poll on BuzzFeed ranked the song as 30th best in the musical.

The Young Folks placed it as the 42nd best song.

Clashcultures placed the song at 20th and claimed that it fills the listener with "hope and sadness".

== History Has Its Eyes on You (mixtape) ==
"History Has Its Eyes on You"

Song by John Legend

from the album The Hamilton Mixtape
- Released: 2016
- Genre: Gospel
- Length: 3:16
- Songwriter: Lin-Manuel Miranda

Audio
- "History Has Its Eyes on You" on YouTube

A cover of the song was recorded for The Hamilton Mixtape. The song was sung by John Legend who also played the piano heard in the song.

As the original casting call for Hamilton called for "a John Legend type" to play George Washington, Legend said he felt comfortable stepping into the role. The song has a different melody and chord progression than the original because Legend opted for a "more gospel" sound.

The producer for The Roots, Ahmir Thompson, told Entertainment Weekly that he was "blown away" by the song and it was what made him realize that "this [the mixtape] could go anywhere".

Slate ranked the song as the 10th best on the mixtape while Paste ranked it lower at the 21st best song.
