= Who Lives, Who Dies, Who Tells Your Story =

Song by cast of Hamilton

from the album Hamilton
- Released: 2015
- Genre: Show tune
- Length: 3:38
- Songwriter: Lin-Manuel Miranda

Audio
- "Who Lives, Who Dies, Who Tells Your Story" on YouTube

"Who Lives, Who Dies, Who Tells Your Story" is the finale song of the musical Hamilton, based on the life of Alexander Hamilton, which premiered on Broadway in 2015. Lin-Manuel Miranda wrote both the music and lyrics to the song.

== Synopsis ==
After the death of Alexander Hamilton, the already deceased George Washington comes forward and repeats a line from his earlier song, "History Has Its Eyes on You": "Let me tell you what I wish I'd known/When I was young and dreamed of glory/You have no control", then the rest of the cast joins in with this song's title: "Who lives, who dies, who tells your story."

Aaron Burr individually reintroduces Thomas Jefferson and James Madison as "President Jefferson" and "President Madison". Both Presidents begrudgingly express respect for Hamilton and the financial system he created.

Angelica points out to the audience that Hamilton was the only one of the Founding Fathers who didn't live long enough to have his story told. Burr raises the question of who tells one's story after one is dead and gone.

Hamilton's wife Eliza Hamilton then comes forward and takes the largest part of the song, revealing that she lived for another 50 years after her husband's death, and all the efforts she made to tell her husband's story, as well as the stories of his fellow American Revolutionary War veterans, and of George Washington when she raises funds for the Washington Monument. She sings of her proudest accomplishment: founding the first private orphanage in New York City, and how the orphans there remind her of her orphaned husband and of raising their late son. Throughout her part of the song, the word "Time" is repeated and emphasized as a motif, representing how Hamilton always felt he was running out of time and contrasts that with the large amount of time Eliza had to tell his story and preserve his legacy. Finally, she expresses her longing to see Alexander again in the afterlife; her final line is "It's only a matter of time." The rest of the cast splits between singing the word "Time" and the song's title, "Who lives, who dies, who tells your story?" As the song ends, Eliza is met by Hamilton, who shakes her hand and leads her to the front of the stage. Eliza suddenly notices the audience and lets out a tearful gasp, nearly hyperventilating, but finally sighs and smiles as the lights go dark.

Vibe explains that "Eliza Hamilton steers the song as she reflects on her life, her marriage to Hamilton and their legacy, which includes the opening of New York City's first private orphanage".

== Analysis ==
The Atlantic's review of the musical notes that Hamilton isn't remembered as fondly as other Founding Fathers; Angelica sings "Every other Founding Father's story gets told. Every other Founding Father gets to grow old". The review also mentions that at the time of Hamilton's extramarital-affair scandal, his political rival Thomas Jefferson was having an affair with his slave Sally Hemings which would have been a bigger scandal at the time, had it been known.

== Critical reception ==
The Village Voice argues that this song's refrain "suggest[s] that we might look differently at the Founding Fathers and their ideas of freedom and equality, depending on who's depicting them". New York City Theatre wrote that "Eliza Hamilton sums up the story and leads the company to a moving finale, when the lights drop as the weight and vision of the American Dream continues its tug of war, between the immigrants who once founded this country and those looking to make her home". Variety wrote that "in the end, Miranda's impassioned narrative of one man's story becomes the collective narrative of a nation, a nation built by immigrants who occasionally need to be reminded where they came from." Newsday described the finale as "focused", while Uloop said it "gives the heaviest meaning to any show in recent memory". The Huffington Post wrote "The show ends with a bang, then a whimper, then a harmony." Vibe said that the "reflective yet dramatic instrumental" backs the casts' "posing of a simple yet deep question". American Theatre thought the titular refrain "seems more of a contemporary hip-hop paradigm than it does a celebration of an unsung founding father".

The A.V. Club wrote "The musical's oft-repeated question, 'Who lives, Who dies, Who tells your story?' is answered not with a self-congratulatory pat on the back about Hamilton's importance but with a salute to a woman whose face can't be found on any currency. It's a breathtaking and unexpected finale—the equivalent of ending Steve Jobs with a five-minute monologue from Kate Winslet's character, Joanna Hoffman, about her own achievements." The New Yorker notes "The last verse—unexpectedly, and powerfully—belongs to Eliza". CentreOnTheAisle said that "Act two, while engaging, doesn't reach the heights of its predecessor, until the show's plaintive 'Finale' in a hauntingly beautiful performance" by Eliza Hamilton.
