= Maria Reynolds =

Alexander Hamilton's mistress (1768–1828)

Maria Lewis Reynolds
- Born: March 30, 1768; New York City
- Died: March 25, 1828 (aged 59); Philadelphia, Pennsylvania
- Other name: Maria Clement
- Spouses: James Reynolds (m. 1783; div. 1793) Jacob Clingman (m. 1795, divorced) Dr. Mathew (m. 1806)
- Children: Susan Reynolds
- Parent(s): Richard Lewis; Susanna Van Der Burgh

Maria Reynolds (née Lewis; March 30, 1768 – March 25, 1828) was the wife of James Reynolds, and was Alexander Hamilton's mistress between 1791 and 1792. She became the object of much scrutiny after the release of the Reynolds Pamphlet and central in America's first political sex scandal.

== Early life ==
Maria Reynolds, born as Mary Lewis, was born in New York City on March 30, 1768, the daughter of Susanna Van Der Burgh and her second husband Richard Lewis. She had six half-siblings, including Col. Lewis DuBois and Captain Henry DuBois, and five full siblings, at least two of whom (older sisters named Susannah and Sarah) lived to adulthood. The Lewises do not appear to have been well-off: Richard Lewis was a merchant and/or laborer, and could not sign his name. Susanna Van Der Burgh Lewis, however, could write at least her name, and Maria Lewis grew up literate, but largely uneducated. On July 28, 1783, when she was age 15, Maria Lewis married James Reynolds. Reynolds had served in the Revolutionary War in the commissary department, and was older than Maria by at least several years. After the war, he tried frequently to claim damages and obtain reimbursement from the government. Maria had one child with Reynolds, a daughter named Susan, born August 18, 1785, later baptized in October.

== The Hamilton affair ==
At some point before 1791, James Reynolds moved with Maria and their daughter from New York to Philadelphia. It was there in summer 1791 that 23-year-old Maria visited 36-year-old Hamilton at his Philadelphia residence and asked for help, claiming her abusive husband had abandoned her. Due to Hamilton's political office, he could very easily help her move back to New York City. Hamilton organized a meeting for later that evening to give Maria the money to cover the immediate costs of relocation. Once Hamilton arrived at the boarding house where Maria was lodging, she brought him upstairs and led him into her bedroom, where he recounts that "Some conversation ensued from which it was quickly apparent that other than pecuniary consolation would be acceptable".

During summer and fall 1791, Maria and Hamilton continued the affair while Hamilton's wife, Eliza, and their children were in Albany, visiting her parents. A short time into the affair, Maria informed Hamilton that her husband had sought a reconciliation with her, to which she agreed without ending the affair with Hamilton. She then obtained an interview for James Reynolds, who applied to Hamilton for a position in the Treasury Office, which Hamilton refused. After Hamilton had shown unequivocal signs that he wanted to end the affair on December 15, 1791, Maria sent him a letter warning of Reynolds's anger over the supposed discovery of the affair:

I have not the time to tell you the cause of my present troubles; only that Mr. Reynolds has wrote you this morning and I know not whether you have got the letter or not and he has swore that if you do not answer, or if he does not see or hear from you today, he will write to Mrs. Hamilton. He has just gone out and I am alone. I think you had better come here one moment that you may know the cause, then you will the better know how to act. Oh, my God, I feel more for you than myself and wish I had never been born to give you so much unhappiness. Do not respond to him; not even a line. Come here soon. Do not send or leave any thing in his power.

From December 15 to December 19, 1791, Reynolds sent threatening letters to Hamilton, and after a personal meeting instead of seeking redress from dueling, he asked for financial compensation. Hamilton complied, paying to Reynolds the requested $1,000 (equivalent to $25,350 in 2025) and discontinuing the affair, as he had wished to do for some time. However, on January 17, 1792, Reynolds wrote to Hamilton inviting him to renew his visits to his wife. Maria, most likely manipulated into the scheme, also began to write to Hamilton whenever her husband was out of the house and seduced him anew. After each of these exchanges, Reynolds would write to Hamilton under the guise of being friends, and Hamilton would, in return, send $30 (equivalent to $761 in 2025). Hamilton's last "loan" of the $50 (equivalent to $1,245 in 2025) to James Reynolds, and possibly the end of the affair, dates in June 1792.

In November 1792, James Reynolds, after illegally purchasing Revolutionary War soldiers' pensions and back-pay claims, was imprisoned for forgery with Virginian Jacob Clingman, his partner in crime. Reynolds wrote to Hamilton, who refused to help and likewise rejected Maria's letters and requests for further money. Clingman then informed Hamilton's Democratic-Republican rivals that Reynolds had information against the Treasury Secretary. James Monroe, Frederick Muhlenberg, and Abraham Venable visited Reynolds in jail, where Reynolds hinted at some unspecified public misconduct on Hamilton's part whose details he promised to expose after coming out of prison, only to disappear immediately after his release on December 12, 1792. The congressmen also personally interviewed Maria who corroborated her husband's accusations of speculation against Hamilton by producing the notes in Hamilton's disguised hand that had accompanied his payments to Reynolds.

On December 15, 1792, Monroe, Venable, and Muhlenberg went to Hamilton with the evidence they had gathered and confronted him on the possible charge of speculation. Fearful of what a scandal could do to his career, Hamilton admitted to the affair with Maria, proved with the letters from both Maria and James Reynolds that his payments to Reynolds related to the blackmail over his adultery, and not to treasury misconduct and asked them to keep the information private as he was innocent of any public wrongdoing. They agreed, although Monroe created copies of the letters and sent them to Thomas Jefferson. John Beckley also created copies of the correspondence. Clingman, on January 1, 1793, declared to Monroe that Maria claimed that the affair had been invented as a cover for the speculation scheme. However, the letter from Colonel Jeremiah Wadsworth to Hamilton dated 2 August 1797 relates how during Reynolds's detention in November–December 1792 Maria had applied to both Wadsworth and Governor General Thomas Mifflin. In the attempt to convince them to help her obtain her husband's release from prison, Maria spontaneously told both of them the story of her first acquaintance and following "amour" with Hamilton in words that match Hamilton's description of their first encounter as reported in both the first draft of the Reynolds Pamphlet of July 1797 (before Wadsworth's letter) and the printed version, also dated July 1797, as well as James Reynolds’ first letter to Hamilton.

== Divorce and second marriage ==
In 1793, Maria enlisted the aid of Aaron Burr and successfully petitioned for a divorce from Reynolds. Before obtaining the divorce she had gone to live with Jacob Clingman — whom she later married in 1795. She took up residence in Alexandria, Virginia.

== The "Reynolds Pamphlet" and aftermath ==
In summer 1797, journalist James T. Callender published a collection of pamphlets entitled The History of the United States for 1796, in which he promised to uncover public wrongdoing on Hamilton's part. On August 25, 1797, unwilling to let the charges of public misconduct lie, Hamilton published what is known as The Reynolds Pamphlet, a 95-page account of Hamilton's affair with Maria and the blackmail scheme set up by her husband. After the Pamphlet was released, Maria was publicly scorned and she and her second husband decided to move to Britain. Having returned to Philadelphia without Clingman some years later, she went by the name of Maria Clement. No record of her divorce from Clingman has been found. Soon thereafter, she became the housekeeper of Dr. Mathew. A merchant by the name of Peter Grotjan in 1842 reported that he had met Maria many years earlier. She had apparently told him that she had written a pamphlet of her own, giving her side of the story that Hamilton had told in his Reynolds Pamphlet. If Maria's pamphlet existed, it was never published. In 1800, her daughter Susan was sent to a Boston boarding school with the help of Congressman William Eustis, who had been petitioned by Aaron Burr to help the girl.

== Later life ==
In 1806, Maria married Dr. Mathew, for whom she had worked as a housekeeper. In 1808, Susan Reynolds came to live with her mother, and spent several years with her in Philadelphia. Susan was married several times, but never happily. However, she birthed two daughters, one of them being Josepha Philips, whom Maria raised from age 12, after Susan's death at age 39. Described by her acquaintance Peter Grotjan as "highly amiable and handsome," Maria Reynolds, now Mathew, became highly respected with her marriage to the doctor. She became religious, joining the Methodist Church, and put her past behind her. "She enjoyed...the love and good will of all who knew her". She died on March 25, 1828.

== In popular culture ==
Maria Reynolds has been the subject of several fictional portrayals.

=== Theater and film ===
- Jeanne Eagels portrayed Maria in the 1917 Broadway stage play Hamilton.
- June Collyer played Maria in the 1931 biographical film Alexander Hamilton.
- Jasmine Cephas Jones played the roles of Maria Reynolds and Peggy Schuyler in Hamilton, the 2015 Broadway musical about the life of Alexander Hamilton. Jones originated the roles on Off-Broadway in Hamilton, reprising the roles when the show transferred to Broadway.

=== Literature ===
- The Whiskey Rebels (2008), by David Liss.
- The Hamilton Affair (2016), by Elizabeth Cobbs.

=== Television ===
- Lise Hilboldt portrayed Maria Reynolds in the 1986 TV series George Washington II: The Forging of a Nation.
