= Debt assumption =

Debt assumption, or simply assumption, was a US financial policy executed under the Funding Act of 1790. The Washington administration pursued the policy, under Secretary of the Treasury Alexander Hamilton's leadership, to assume the outstanding debt of states that had not yet repaid their American Revolutionary War bonds and a scrip. Some states, such as Virginia, had already repaid their debt. The policy of assumption, Hamilton argued, required expanded federal taxation, including a tariff and an excise tax on whiskey. Western farmers violently protested in the Whiskey Rebellion.

Historian Max M. Edling has explained how assumptions worked. The Compromise of 1790 was reached by Hamilton, Jefferson, and Madison to include both assumption of state debts and the location of the permanent national capital in the South. The assumption was the critical issue; the location of the capital was a bargaining ploy. Hamilton proposed that the federal Treasury take over and pay off all the debt that states had incurred to pay for the American Revolution. The Treasury would issue bonds that rich people would buy, thereby giving the rich a tangible stake in the success of the national government. Hamilton proposed to pay off the new bonds with revenue from a new tariff on imports. Jefferson originally approved the scheme, but Madison had turned him around by arguing that federal control of debt would consolidate too much power in the national government. Edling points out that after its passage in 1790, the assumption was accepted. Madison did try to pay speculators below 100%, but they were paid the face value of the state debts they held regardless of how little they paid for them. When Jefferson became president he continued the system. The credit of the U.S. was solidly established at home and abroad, and Hamilton was successful in signing up many of the bondholders in his new Federalist Party. Good credit allowed Jefferson's Treasury Secretary Albert Gallatin to borrow in Europe to finance the Louisiana Purchase in 1803, as well as to borrow to finance the War of 1812.

== See also ==
- Bibliography of Alexander Hamilton
- Compromise of 1790
- History of the United States public debt
- Louisiana Purchase
