= After Piketty =

2017 economics essay collection edited by Boushey, DeLong, and Steinbaum

After Piketty The Agenda for Economics and Inequality
- First edition
- Editors: Heather Boushey; J. Bradford DeLong; Marshall Steinbaum
- Language: French
- Subjects: Capitalism, economic history, economic inequality
- Publisher: Harvard University Press
- Publication date: 8 May 2017
- Media type: Print (Hardback)
- Pages: 688 pp.
- ISBN: 978-0-674-50477-6 (alk. paper)

After Piketty: The Agenda for Economics and Inequality is a 2017 collection of essays edited by the economists Heather Boushey, J. Bradford DeLong, and Marshall Steinbaum. The essays center on how to integrate inequality into economic thinking. Common themes are Thomas Piketty’s influence on academia and policy, the need for better wealth data, inequality in the United States, and the reasons for the process of wealth accumulation and rising inequality discussed by Piketty in his book Capital in the Twenty-First Century (2013). In the final entry, Piketty himself responds to the essays.

== Contents ==
The book's essays are divided into five sections: "Reception", "Conceptions of Capital", "Dimensions of Inequality", "The Political Economy of Capital and Capitalism", and "Piketty Responds".

=== Reception ===
- Arthur Goldhammer - "The Piketty Phenomenon"
- Robert Solow - "Thomas Piketty Is Right"
- Paul Krugman - "Why We're in a New Gilded Age"

=== Conceptions of Capital ===
- Devesh Raval - "What's Wrong with Capital in the Twenty-First Century''s Model?"
- Suresh Naidu - "A Political Economy Take on W/Y"
- Daina Ramey Berry - "The Ubiquitous Nature of Slave Capital"
- Eric R. Nielsen - "Human Capital and Wealth before and after Capital in the Twenty-First Century”
- Laura Tyson and Michael Spence - "Exploring the Effects of Technology on Income and Wealth Inequality"
- David Weil - "Income Inequality, Wage Determination, and the Fissured Workplace"

=== Dimensions of Inequality ===
- Branko Milanović - "Increasing Capital Income Share and Its Effect on Personal Income Inequality"
- Christoph Lakner - "Global Inequality"
- Gareth A. Jones - "The Geographies of Capital in the Twenty-First Century: Inequality, Political Economy, and Space”
- Emmanuel Saez -"The Research Agenda after Capital in the Twenty-First Century”
- Mariacristina De Nardi, Giulio Fella, and Fang Yang - "Macro Models of Wealth Inequality"
- Heather Boushey - "A Feminist Interpretation of Patrimonial Capitalism“
- Mark Zandi - "What Does Rising Inequality Mean for the Macroeconomy?"
- Salvatore Morelli - "Rising Inequality and Economic Stability"

=== The Political Economy of Capital and Capitalism ===
- Marshall I. Steinbaum - "Inequality and the Rise of Social Democracy: An Ideological History"
- David Singh Grewal - "The Legal Constitution of Capitalism"
- Ellora Derenoncourt - "The Historical Origins of Global Inequality"
- Elisabeth Jacobs - "Everywhere and Nowhere: Politics in Capital in the Twenty-First Century“

=== Piketty Responds ===
- Thomas Piketty - "Toward a Reconciliation between Economics and the Social Sciences"

== Reviews ==
Asad Abbasi of London School of Economics described After Piketty as a work of serious scholarship, saying, "Readers without a background in economics will find some chapters daunting, terminology-wise." Abbasi claimed,"Piketty hopes that his work provokes discussion on wealth and inequality. After Piketty not only generates such debate, but also deepens it by highlighting the gaps missed by Piketty."

Melissa S. Kearney of Foreign Affairs said the essays "put Piketty’s arguments into a broad historical and intellectual context and highlight some noteworthy omissions that call into question his book’s most dire predictions." She lauded the collection as "an intellectual excursion of a kind rarely offered by modern economics." However, she said that the contributors overly assume wealthy elites will maintain high positions regardless of left-wing policies and that contributors "do not explore those potential policies at great length, nor do they consider the precise mechanisms that would shape pushback from the elites." Kearney described the Brexit vote and Trump's election as evidence against the view that elites can overcome support for more wealth redistribution.

Paschal Donohoe of The Irish Times stated that "despite its size, this collection misses so much." Donohoe said that the collection's editors fail to be impartial by describing critics' arguments as substance-free, and that there has been potent criticism of Piketty concerning "whether laws can exist in economics, whether the digital economy disrupts the accumulation and transfer of wealth, and even whether Piketty confuses wealth with capital." Donohoe also argued, "I do not believe that inequality is inevitable. Progressive taxation and social interventions make a difference. But such perspectives do not receive adequate prominence."
