= Removal of the Federal Government =

Much of Washington, D.C. was destroyed in the Burning of Washington on August 24, 1814 during the War of 1812. Following the destruction of Washington, the American leadership under James Madison considered removing the federal government of the United States from D.C. It eventually chose to reconstruct the seat of government in D.C.

== The Debate on Removing the Federal Government from D.C. ==
From the beginning of the founding of the Nation, a heavily debated, political issue was the location of the governing body and subsequent capital of the United States. After many years, multiple relocations, rehashing of the argument, compromises, policy and one fire, the Burning of Washington, August 24, 1814, part of the War of 1812 it was concrete that the capital of America would long be Washington D.C. However, before Congress made the decision to keep the capital in Washington it debated to uproot it.

=== Compromise of 1790 ===
The location of the federal government was a result of the Compromise of 1790, the agreement that the capital would be placed below the Mason–Dixon line as a compromise to states assuming the Federal Government's Revolutionary war debt. The Compromise of 1790 was arranged between then Secretary of the Treasury Alexander Hamilton, Congressman James Madison, and Secretary of State Thomas Jefferson in June 1790. The compromise resulted in moving the capital from New York to Philadelphia (for ten years) and finally to Washington D.C.. Hamilton agreed to provide the votes in Congress for the capital while Jefferson and Madison ensured enactment of Hamilton's plan for the assumption of the Revolutionary War debts of the states by the federal government.

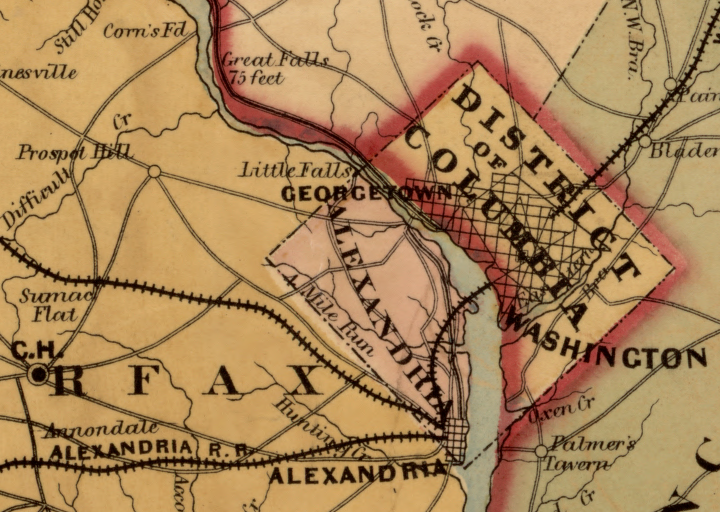
A map of Washington D.C., Result of the Compromise of 1790. The plans for the new city to house the seat of government.

=== Locations of the Capital ===
Prior, the capital shifted up and down the northeast coast of the United States. Initially, the First Continental Congress met in Philadelphia in 1774. After this, the body moved to Baltimore, Lancaster, PA, and York, PA. Between 1781 and 1788, Congress met in Philadelphia, Princeton, New Jersey, Annapolis, Maryland, Trenton, New Jersey, and New York. After Congress was legitimized by the Constitution, it met in New York, Philadelphia^{[5]} and briefly Trenton, New Jersey, before finally in 1800, Washington D.C.

=== Debates between 1800-1808 ===
Between 1800 and 1808 Congressmen made several attempts to remove the federal government from D.C. At this time when travel was difficult and time consuming. Many congressmen felt that the capital should be somewhere “with greater security and less inconvenience” as well as being a more accessible location via a water way. A majority of both houses wanted to move the seat of government to Pennsylvania, either Philadelphia, a centrally located gateway to the West, or Lancaster.

In 1804, the Senate considered a motion to move the capital to Baltimore. However the then Senator from Massachusetts and future President, John Quincy Adams, questioned the constitutionality of this proposal arguing that the Constitution did not give Congress the authority to “relocate the seat of government, only to govern it” and that to do so would be in direct violation of the formal clauses of the Compromise of 1790 - formally titled as “The Residence Act”.

In 1808, Representative James Sloan of New Jersey, argued that the cosmetics and atmosphere of Washington was not indicative of the nation as a whole and that Philadelphia, then a shining political and social hub on the east coast, should be named the capital. In contrast, critics claimed, Washington was ill-planned with public buildings constructed poorly and faraway from each other. Moreover, it was sparsely populated and lacked the romantic metropolitan aesthetic that New York City and Philadelphia had at this time. After much debate, the motion to relocate the capital to Baltimore failed in the House by a vote of 51-35.

=== Destruction of Documents and Buildings ===
The British invasion on the capital in August 1814, created the opportunity to revisit the pros and con of removing the government from Washington. Crucial buildings and documents were destroyed that were vital to the governing of the nation. A portion of the Capitol Building was destroyed, and the U.S. Treasury was in ashes. The War and State Departments as well as the Navy Yard were scorched and infamously the White House was destroyed. At the Navy Yard, clerks were ordered to torch ships and ammunitions to prevent the British from seizing them. This collective blaze was reportedly seen as far away as Baltimore. The original library of the United States Congress was also destroyed in the fire. All 3,000 of the books housed in the library were destroyed. Less than a month later, Thomas Jefferson offered his private collection of 6,487 books as a replacement to Congress. The United States purchased his library for $23,950 in 1815, and it became the foundation of the modern collection of the Library of Congress.

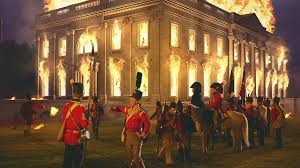
Shows British soldiers burning the White House

Congress created the national archives in 1934. Prior, it required each executive department to keep its own archives.

For example, the Department of State was in charge of preserving the nation's early state papers including the records of the Confederation and Continental Congresses, George Washington's papers as commander of the Continental Army, the Declaration of Independence, and the Constitution. The papers were stored in boxes and trunks in attics of public buildings scattered throughout the city - at risk to weather, water, neglect, fire, theft. At the Department of State, clerks John Graham, Stephen Pleasanton, and Josias King saved the documents in custody. Bringing bags and trunks to load onto carts, they saved books and papers of the State Department, unpublished secret journals of Congress, George Washington's commission and correspondence, the Articles of Confederation, the papers of the Continental Congress, and treaties, laws, and correspondence dating back to 1789. Along with these early records, the clerks also saved the Constitution, Declaration of Independence, and Bill of Rights.

First Lady Dolley Madison saved numerous Cabinet papers as well as Gilbert Stuart's famous Landsdowne portrait of George Washington.

Yet a, majority of the archives of Congress stored in the Capital were destroyed. Due to lack of resources, people and time, it was simply too late. Some were spared, however. House clerks Samuel Burch and J. T. Frost moved House papers to a secret location and Senate clerk Lewis Machen took Senate documents to his farm in Maryland. The salvaged documents included military numbers and logistics, the Senate's history over the past quarter century, and various confidential papers.

=== Debate and Reconstruction ===
In order to rebuild and move forward, President James Madison wrote to the Senate in September 1814. He authorized that Congress would convene in the Patent and Post Office building as it was the only government building to escape the attack: “The destruction of the Capitol by the Enemy having made it necessary that other accommodations should be provided for the meeting of Congress, chambers for the Senate and for the House of Representatives…have been fitted up…in the Public Building heretofore allotted for the Post and other Public Offices.” Congress met there from September 1814 until December 1815.

As soon as Congress convened, discussions on removing the government resumed. The Clerk of the Special Council, Thomas Bedfordfree^{[}, pushed to remove the government temporarily to Philadelphia. However, the proposal was ultimately defeated by the House when it was put to a vote on September 26, 1814. Simultaneously, Philadelphia's city government offered their resources to the government and was willing to house them offering, “suitable places for their accommodation, as well as that of the other departments.”.

A House committee was formed to investigate whether or not Washington was secure enough to house the government and if it was financially viable to rebuild. The committee ruled that a move to Philadelphia, either temporarily or permanently, would be “inexpedient.” On October 3, 1814, there was a vote to change the deciding word from “inexpedient” to “expedient”, the vote was split, 68–68, and Speaker of the House Henry Clay, broke the tie ultimately deciding that Washington D.C. would remain the nation's capital. District citizens built a temporary brick Capitol on the site of the present day Supreme Court of the United States for Congress to meet in.
