= The Room Where It Happens =

Song from the 2015 musical Hamilton

Song by Leslie Odom Jr., Lin-Manuel Miranda, Daveed Diggs, Okieriete Onaodowan, and the cast of Hamilton

from the album Hamilton
- Released: 2015
- Genre: Show tune; jazz
- Length: 5:19
- Songwriter: Lin-Manuel Miranda

Audio
- "The Room Where It Happens" on YouTube

"The Room Where It Happens" is the fifth song from Act 2 of the musical Hamilton, based on the life of Alexander Hamilton, which premiered on Broadway in 2015. The musical relates the life of Alexander Hamilton and his relationships with his family and Aaron Burr. The book, music, and lyrics of the musical, including this song, were composed by Lin-Manuel Miranda. The song describes the Compromise of 1790 from Burr's perspective.

== Background ==
The song's writer and composer, Lin-Manuel Miranda, explained, "'Wait for It' and 'The Room Where It Happens' are two of the best songs I've ever written in my life and [Aaron Burr] got them both" (as opposed to Alexander Hamilton, Miranda's character in the original cast).

Alex Lacamoire, Hamilton's musical director, explained how he came to add a banjo to a hip-hop band: "'The Room Where it Happens' just cried for it. The single greatest idea in the whole show, only because it's so quirky and is so of the style of the music. It's so Kander and Ebb-y, Dixieland, so I just sat down to orchestrate it, and I'm thinking to myself, 'What can the guitar do?' And literally in a flash of light, I'm like, 'Oh my god, it could be a banjo!' It invokes the feel of the song and I think it really fits in the world of it, but it's also so left of center and not what you would expect."

== Synopsis ==
Aaron Burr and Secretary of the Treasury Alexander Hamilton discuss the legacy of the deceased General Hugh Mercer, pondering what their own legacies will be. The conversation then turns to Hamilton's attempt to gain approval from Congress for his proposed financial system, including the Funding Act of 1790. Their discussion is interrupted as Hamilton is ushered to a secret dinner table meeting, at which he, Thomas Jefferson, and James Madison agree upon an unprecedented political compromise: the capital city of their new nation will be situated on the Potomac River—politically and geographically placing it in the South, Jefferson and Madison's home region—in exchange for the Democratic-Republican Party's support of Hamilton's financial plan. Burr ponders Jefferson's reports on the meeting, and enviously comments on how the American people, and more specifically himself, had no agency in this decision. An outraged Burr confronts Hamilton for "sell[ing] New York down the river" and demands to know why; Hamilton replies he had to in order to get his plan passed and be remembered, then goads Burr about his reluctance to stand for anything. Burr decides to rectify this by running for political office so as to be in the metaphorical "room where it happens"—in other words, to be a party to important decisions.

Claire Lampen of Yahoo News explained "History has drawn much of its information on the compromise from Thomas Jefferson's account of the evening, according to PBS; neither Miranda nor anyone else can be entirely certain what happened behind those closed doors". This grants Miranda artistic liberty and freedom in retelling the story of the compromise.

== Style ==
Monesha Woods of Vibe wrote that song is sung over a "snazzy, jazzy beat almost to tease [Hamilton's] VIP status". Film and stage theater columnist Elizabeth Logan of The Huffington Post said the "slick" song is "just Fosse enough", and that it is "yet another reminder that American politicians have always, always made secret deals." Arts and culture scholar Alisa Solomon of The Nation described it as a "razzmatazz show-tune". Theatrical reviewer David Cote of Timeout deemed it "the ultimate outsider's jazz romp". Theater critic Peter Marks of The Washington Post called it "a bluesy elucidation of a politician's urge to be at the center of the action". Poet and Catholic blogger Monique Ocampo of Patheos deemed it Burr's "villain song". Playwright and dramatic expert Carol Rocamora of Broad Street Review deemed it a "pop ballad". Theater staff writer Anna Maples of MOVE Magazine says the song was her "personal favorite" and has a "blend of New Orleans and Dixieland jazz." WIUX said:

Burr doesn't take his shot until 1791, in the true showstopper "The Room Where It Happens"—the jazzy event horizon that drives Burr to Jefferson and the Democratic-Republicans, against Hamilton across party lines. In unflattering terms, this song describes the compromise that moved our capital to D.C. and created our first national bank. Onstage, it's the height of suspense, and much more than debt involvement policy. It's Burr, drunk on the idea of power, drunk with the want Hamilton has always had and expected from him, entering the political arena and "the room where it happens." As Hamilton meets him, emerging from the mysterious dinner in "the room where it happens", he taunts Burr with the same words from "Aaron Burr, Sir".

Arts critic Colin Dabkowski of The Buffalo News deemed it "quiet and haunting". Playwright and ATCA member Lou Harry of IBJ argued that the song "demonstrates an awareness and respect for 'Someone In a Tree', from Stephen Sondheim's Pacific Overtures score". Theater critic Robert Cushman of the National Post expanded on this comparison, writing that "like its predecessor, this song grows in intensity as it proceeds, spurred on by its staging." Making reference to a different Broadway musical, Jeff McGregor of Smithsonian Magazine said the experience of watching the performance is "a lot like seeing Ben Vereen take the stage for the first time in Jesus Christ Superstar, a watershed for performer and audience".

== Critical reception ==
The song received critical acclaim. The New York Times said the "jivey... wicked meditation on being a political outsider" is "now a full-fledged showstopper". Huffington Post said that it makes the audience root for Burr, and The Hollywood Reporter called the song a showstopper and a "rousing number". Entertainment Weekly deemed it the show's biggest showstopper, describing it as "pulse-quickening" and "surprising". Daily Review said the song is "an ode to power and the desperate desire to be in the inner sanctum." The Los Angeles Times "grooved" to the song and appreciated how "Aaron Burr ditches his usual political double talk for no-holds-barred showmanship". This shows how much Aaron Burr is serious about his job.

Talkin' Broadway argues that the song's lyrics do little narrative heavy lifting, "hardly crystalizing more of the man for us". Variety argues the song reveals Burr's "frustration and yearning." The Wall Street Journal deemed it a "spectacular second-act production number". NBC New York argued that the song reveals Burr's true nature as a "stop-at-nothing climber obsessed with relevancy". The New Yorker listed it as one of the top ten showstoppers of 2015, describing it as an "unforgettable... song about power and powerlessness".

National Post wrote that the song is the show's most exciting number, aided by the "brilliance of Andy Blankenbuehler's choreography, an almost ceaseless but never excessive swirl, precisely keyed to the beats." The Wrap deemed it an "infectious showstopper". New York Theatre Guide writes that "the experience is visceral for us all and becomes a show stopper." NBC New York described it as a "sly, dangerous... show-stealing number." Deadline deemed it "one of the show's most memorable songs." Theater Mania said it is one of the show's "most high-flying [numbers]". The Post Gazette remarked that the song "bring[s] down the house." Emertainment Monthly noted the song is "one of the most monumental numbers in Hamilton". Uloop called it one of the show's catchiest tunes, along with "Wait For It". RG Magazine wrote the song "captures the emotional and political complexities of Burr."

== Certifications ==
Certifications for "The Room Where It Happens"
Region	Certification	Certified units/sales
New Zealand (RMNZ)	Gold	15,000^{‡}
United Kingdom (BPI)	Silver	200,000^{‡}
United States (RIAA)	Platinum	1,000,000^{‡}
^{‡} Sales+streaming figures based on certification alone.

== See also ==
- "I Want" song
