= Todd Tucker =

American academic, political scientist, and political commentator

- Born: Todd Nathaniel Tucker; 1979 (age 45–46); Louisville, Kentucky, U.S.
- Spouse: Heather Boushey (m. 2007)

Academic background
- Education: George Washington University (BA); University of Cambridge (PhD)

Academic work
- Discipline: Economic policy International economics International trade International law
- Sub-discipline: Trade agreements

Todd Nathaniel Tucker (born 1979) is an American academic, political scientist, and political commentator who is director of governance studies at the Roosevelt Institute, where he specializes in the study of trade agreements and international law.

== Early life and education ==
Tucker was born in Louisville, Kentucky, the son of Baptist missionaries who worked in Buenos Aires, Argentina. A Gates Scholar, he received a Bachelor of Arts degree from George Washington University and a PhD from the University of Cambridge.

== Career ==
His work focuses on the legal, economic and political implications of the World Trade Organization (WTO), North American Free Trade Agreement (NAFTA), Central America Free Trade Agreement (CAFTA) and other trade agreements and debt relief issues.

He is a media commentator on international economic and policy issues who has been cited and published by radio, print and Internet outlets such as the Los Angeles Times, the Washington Post, the Wall Street Journal, the Financial Times, The Nation, Dissent Magazine, Foreign Policy In Focus, and other publications.

In 2018, his book Judge Knot was published by Anthem Press.

He was research director of Public Citizen's Global Trade Watch division and primary blogger at Eyes on Trade. He is co-author of The Rise and Fall of Fast Track Trade Authority, a 2009 book about the history of the expansion of executive-branch involvement in the formation of U.S. trade policy and the expansion of trade policy into non-tariff matters like consumer protection rules.

Tucker was also a policy analyst with the Center for Economic and Policy Research. According to The Nation, Tucker was a leader of the United Students Against Sweatshops student movement. He helped lead the movement to create staff trade unions at non-governmental organizations, according to a 2004 article from the National Organizer's Alliance.

In 2020, Tucker was named a volunteer member of the Joe Biden presidential transition Agency Review Team to support transition efforts related to the Department of Commerce and the Office of the United States Trade Representative.

== Personal life ==
On March 31, 2007, Tucker married Heather Boushey, senior economist at the Center for Economic and Policy Research.
