= Jobs created during U.S. presidential terms =

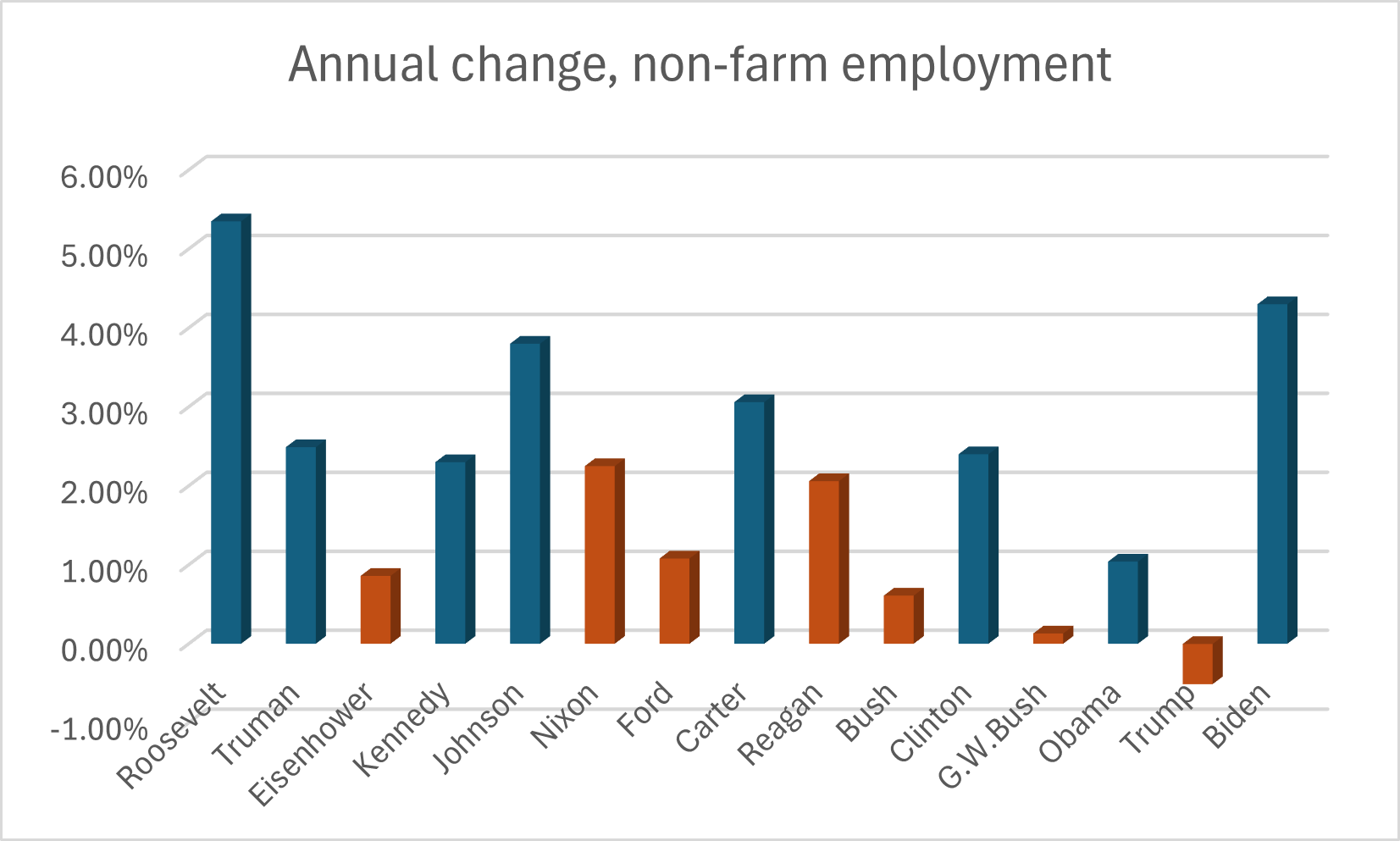
Annualized change in non-farm employment over each presidency from 1939 to 2023. Democrats are in blue and Republicans in red.

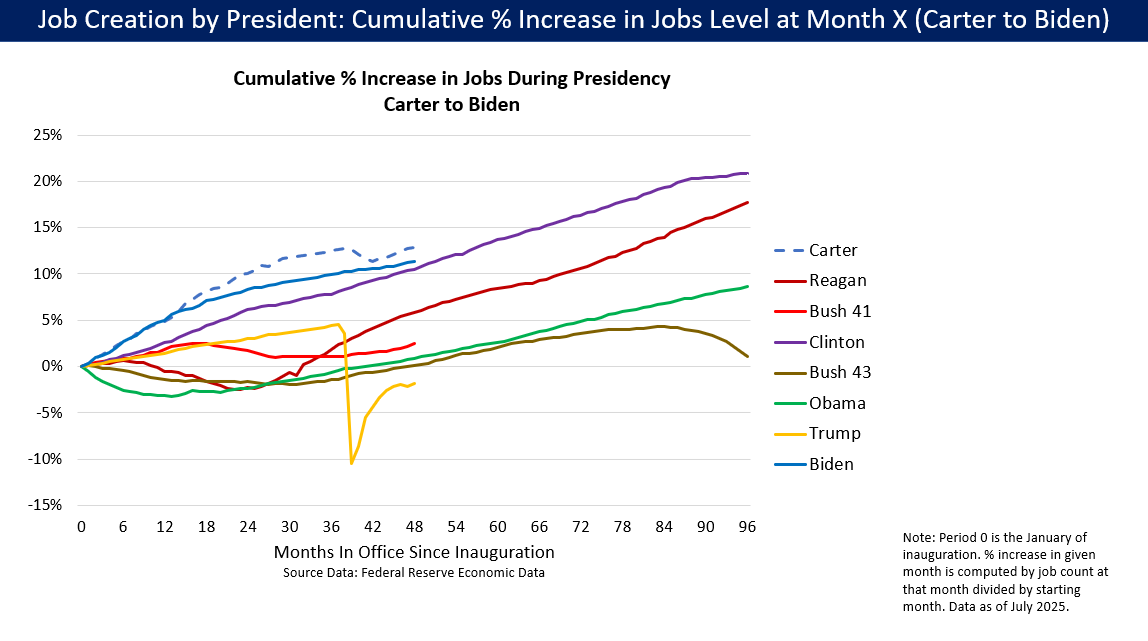
Job growth by U.S. president, measured as cumulative percentage change from month after inauguration to end of term

Politicians and pundits frequently refer to the ability of the president of the United States to "create jobs" in the U.S. during his term in office. The numbers are most often seen during the election season or in regard to a president's economic legacy. The numbers typically used and most frequently cited by economists are total nonfarm payroll employment numbers as collected by the Bureau of Labor Statistics on a monthly and annual basis. The BLS also provides numbers for private-sector non-farm employment and other subsets of the aggregate.

Among the presidents from Jimmy Carter to Donald Trump, Bill Clinton created the most jobs at 22.9 million. Clinton also had the largest cumulative percentage increase in jobs at 20.1%. This computation treats the base month as the December before the month of inauguration and last month as December of the final full year in office. Using the month after inauguration as the base month as shown in the accompanying diagram, the top four (out of these eight) presidents in terms of cumulative job creation percentage are Clinton (D), Reagan (R), Carter (D), and Biden (D).

== Methodology ==
The jobs numbers are reported as part of the "Monthly Employment Situation Report" from the Bureau of Labor Statistics. The widely publicized "job creation" number is a net figure, computed as jobs created less jobs lost during the survey month. Estimates are generated via the "Establishment Survey", also known as the payroll survey or Current Employment Statistics (CES) program. The Establishment Survey as of May 2020 included "approximately 145,000 businesses and government agencies representing approximately 697,000 worksites." The Establishment Survey publishes jobs, hours, and earnings estimates at varying levels of detail (nation, state, metro area) and for different industries.

The sample establishments are drawn from private non-farm businesses such as factories, offices, and stores, as well as federal, state, and local government entities. Employees on non-farm payrolls are those who received pay for any part of the reference pay period (which includes the 12th of the month), including persons on paid leave. Further, BLS explains that: "The CES employment series are estimates of nonfarm wage and salary jobs, not an estimate of employed persons; an individual with two jobs is counted twice by the payroll survey. The CES employment series excludes employees in agriculture, private households, and the self-employed." These monthly job counts are revised (sometimes by 20% or more) within 90 days to reflect additional data, seasonal adjustment models, and annual adjustments resulting from unemployment insurance filings. Figures are seasonally adjusted, which removes from the series the effects of normal variation from recurring events within a year, such as holidays and weather changes, and helps reveal underlying economic trends.

Journalist Glenn Kessler of The Washington Post explained in 2020 that economists debate which month to use as the base for counting job creation, between either January of the first term (the month of inauguration) or February. Survey data is typically from around the twelfth of the month, so January numbers are counted before the new president takes office. For that reason, The Washington Post uses the February jobs level as the starting point. For example, for President Obama, the computation takes the 145.815 million jobs of February 2017 and subtracts the 133.312 million jobs of February 2009 to arrive at the 12.503 million figure. Four of the top five presidents in terms of total jobs added were Democrats. For these 13 presidents beginning with Truman, total job creation was 2.4 times faster under Democrats, 70.5 million for the seven Democratic presidents and 29.1 million for the six Republican presidents. The Democratic presidents were in office for a total of 429 months, with 164,000 jobs per month added on average, while the Republicans were in office for 475 months, with a 61,000 jobs added per month average. The table below summarizes the results for the past seven presidents, with data through January 2021 for President Trump:

Job creation by president	Carter	Reagan	G.H.W. Bush	Clinton	G.W. Bush	Obama	Trump	Biden
Total jobs added (millions)	10.117	16.128	2.617	22.745	0.523	11.570	-2.670	16.140
Months in office	48	96	48	96	96	96	48	48
Jobs added per month (avg. in thousands)	211	168	55	237	5	121	-56	336

== Controversy ==
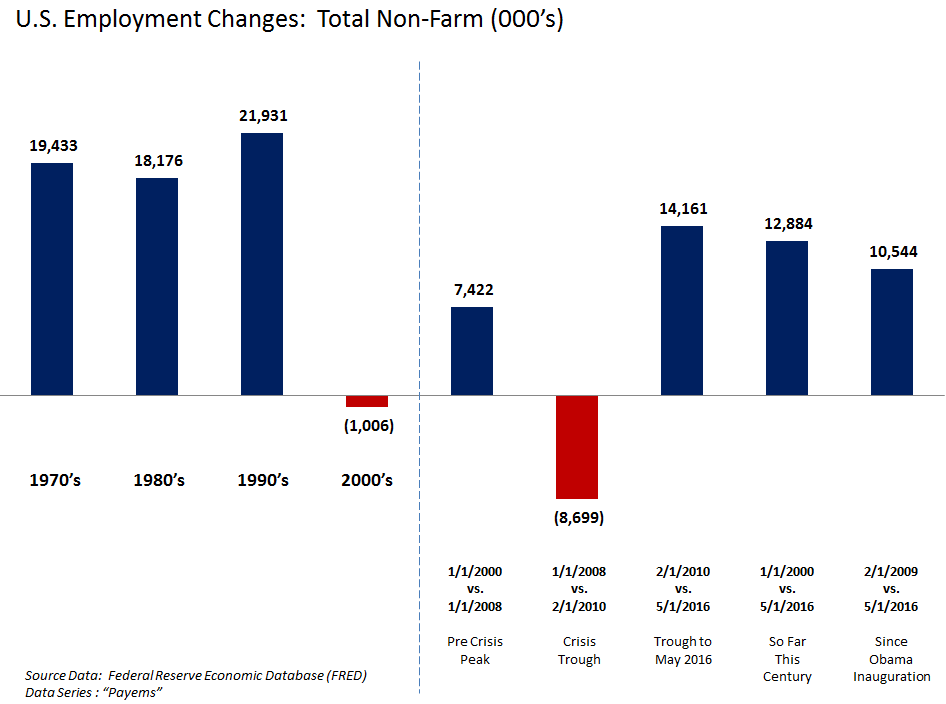
U.S. changes in employment for selected time periods

According to a Harris Poll, despite persistent reports that inflation is falling and the unemployment rate is nearing a 50-year low, two-thirds of Americans (68%) are unhappy with the economy.

== Job creation lists ==
=== By four-year presidential term ===
Numbers listed from 1941 and onward are Bureau of Labor Statistics data of nonfarm jobs (in thousands), and are shown from the year beginning and ending each presidential term. The monthly statistics are quoted from January, as U.S. presidents take office at the end of that month.

U.S. president	Party	Term years	Start jobs	End jobs	Created	% change	Avg. annual increase
Harding/Coolidge	R	1921–1925	25,000 **	29,500 **	+ 4,500 **	+18.00% **	+4.23% **
Calvin Coolidge	R	1925–1929	29,500 **	32,100 **	+ 2,600 **	+8.81% **	+2.13% **
Herbert Hoover	R	1929–1933	32,100 **	25,700 **	-6,400 **	-19.94% **	-5.41% **
Franklin D. Roosevelt	D	1933–1937	25,700 **	31,200 **	+ 5,500 **	+21.40% **	+4.97% **
Franklin D. Roosevelt	D	1937–1941	31,200 **	34,481	+ 3,280 **	+10.52% **	+2.53% **
Franklin Roosevelt	D	1941–1945	34,481	41,895	+ 7,414	+21.50%	+5.00%
Roosevelt/Truman	D	1945–1949	41,895	44,668	+ 2,773	+6.62%	+1.61%
Harry Truman	D	1949–1953	44,668	50,144	+ 5,476	+12.26%	+2.93%
Dwight D. Eisenhower	R	1953–1957	50,144	52,887	+ 2,743	+5.47%	+1.34%
Dwight D. Eisenhower	R	1957–1961	52,887	53,683	+ 796	+1.51%	+0.87%
Kennedy/Johnson	D	1961–1965	53,683	59,582	+ 5,899	+10.99%	+2.64%
Lyndon B. Johnson	D	1965–1969	59,582	69,439	+ 9,857	+16.54%	+3.90%
Richard Nixon	R	1969–1973	69,439	75,617	+ 6,178	+8.90%	+2.15%
Nixon/Ford	R	1973–1977	75,617	80,690	+ 5,073	+6.71%	+1.66%
Jimmy Carter	D	1977–1981	80,690	91,033	+10,343	+12.82%	+3.06%
Ronald Reagan	R	1981–1985	91,033	96,372	+ 5,339	+5.86%	+1.44%
Ronald Reagan	R	1985–1989	96,372	107,161	+10,789	+11.20%	+2.69%
George H. W. Bush	R	1989–1993	107,161	109,795	+ 2,634	+2.46%	+0.61%
Bill Clinton	D	1993–1997	109,795	121,368	+11,573	+10.54%	+2.54%
Bill Clinton	D	1997–2001	121,368	132,699	+11,331	+9.34%	+2.26%
George W. Bush	R	2001–2005	132,699	132,779	+ 80	+0.06%	+0.02%
George W. Bush	R	2005–2009	132,779	134,066	+ 1,287	+0.97%	+0.24%
Barack Obama	D	2009–2013	134,066	135,263	+ 1,197	+0.90%	+0.22%
Barack Obama	D	2013–2017	135,263	145,636	+ 10,373	+7.67%	+1.86%
Trump (1st Term)	R	2017–2021	145,636	142,913	2,720	-1.87%	-0.47%
Joe Biden	D	2021–2025	142,913	159,053	+ 16,140	+11.29%	+2.82%

**In thousands. Approximate

=== By presidency ===
Change in nonfarm employment for all U.S. presidents since 1939 (data from the Bureau of Labor Statistics)
President	Political party	Length of presidency	Nonfarm employment at the start of presidency (in thousands)	Nonfarm employment at the end of presidency (in thousands)	Annual percentage change in nonfarm employment
Franklin D. Roosevelt (data available for 1939–1945 only)	Democratic	1933–1945	29,923 (for January 1939)	41,446	5.35% (annual average from January 1939 to April 1945)
Harry S. Truman	Democratic	1945–1953	41,446	50,144	2.49%
Dwight D. Eisenhower	Republican	1953–1961	50,144	53,683	0.86%
John F. Kennedy	Democratic	1961–1963	53,683	57,255	2.30%
Lyndon B. Johnson	Democratic	1963–1969	57,255	69,439	3.80%
Richard Nixon	Republican	1969–1974	69,439	78,619	2.25%
Gerald R. Ford	Republican	1974–1977	78,619	80,690	1.08%
Jimmy Carter	Democratic	1977–1981	80,690	91,033	3.06%
Ronald Reagan	Republican	1981–1989	91,033	107,161	2.06%
George H. W. Bush	Republican	1989–1993	107,161	109,794	0.61%
Bill Clinton	Democratic	1993–2001	109,794	132,698	2.40%
George W. Bush	Republican	2001–2009	132,698	134,055	0.13%
Barack Obama	Democratic	2009–2017	134,055	145,612	1.04%
Donald Trump	Republican	2017–2021	145,612	142,913	-0.51%
Joe Biden	Democratic	2021–2025	142,913	159,053	3.1%

For information on the United States public debt divided by gross domestic product by presidential term, see National debt by U.S. presidential terms

== Graphs and data ==
The Federal Reserve Economic Data (FRED) database contains the total nonfarm employment level. A graph with a simple download of data on jobs by month since the late 1930s is available here:

- Federal Reserve Economic Data (FRED) Database-Total Non-Farm Employment (PAYEMS Data Series)

== See also ==
- U.S. economic performance under Democratic and Republican presidents

== External links and references ==
- BLS Employment Situation Archived News Releases
- BLS Employment Situation Explanatory Note

Jobs Created During Each Presidency Term
