= James Bradford DeLong =

American economist (born 1960)

J. Bradford DeLong
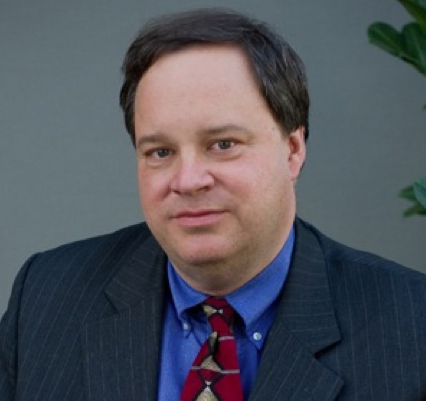
- DeLong in October 2010
- Born: James Bradford DeLong; June 24, 1960 (age 66); Boston, Massachusetts, U.S.

Academic background
- Education: Harvard University (BA, MA, PhD)
- Thesis: Returning to the Gold Standard: A Macroeconomic History of Britain and France in the 1920s (1987)
- Doctoral advisor: Larry Summers
- Influences: Adam Smith; John Maynard Keynes; Milton Friedman; Lawrence Summers; Andrei Shleifer

Academic work
- Discipline: Macroeconomics
- School or tradition: New Keynesian economics
- Institutions: University of California, Berkeley
- Website: Information at IDEAS / RePEc

James Bradford "Brad" DeLong (born June 24, 1960) is an American economic historian who has been a professor of economics at the University of California, Berkeley, since 1993.

== Early life and education ==
DeLong was born in Boston, Massachusetts, on June 24, 1960. He received a BA in social studies from Harvard University in 1982, and a PhD in economics from Harvard in 1987. From 1986 to 1987, he was an instructor at MIT, and he taught economics at Harvard and Boston University from 1987 to 1993. In 1991–1992, he was a John M. Olin Fellow at the National Bureau of Economic Research, where he has also been a research associate since 1995.

== Career ==
DeLong joined Berkeley as an associate professor in 1993. From April 1993 to May 1995, he served as Deputy Assistant Secretary for Economic Policy at the Treasury Department in Washington, D.C. As an official in the Treasury Department in the Clinton administration, he worked on the 1993 federal budget, the unsuccessful health care reform effort, and other policies, and on several trade issues, including the Uruguay Round of the General Agreement on Tariffs and Trade and the North American Free Trade Agreement. He became a full professor at Berkeley in 1997 and has been there ever since.

DeLong has been a research associate of the National Bureau of Economic Research (NBER), a visiting scholar at the Federal Reserve Bank of San Francisco, and an Alfred P. Sloan Research Fellow. Along with Joseph Stiglitz and Aaron Edlin, DeLong is co-editor of The Economists' Voice, and has been co-editor of the Journal of Economic Perspectives. He is the author of a textbook, Macroeconomics, the second edition of which he coauthored with Martha Olney. With Heather Boushey and Marshall Steinbaum, he co-edited the book After Piketty: The Agenda for Economics and Inequality (2017), a volume of 22 essays about how to integrate inequality into economic thinking. He also contributes to Project Syndicate.

In 1990 and 1991, DeLong and Lawrence Summers co-wrote two theoretical papers that became critical theoretical underpinnings for the financial deregulation put in place when Summers was Secretary of the Treasury under Bill Clinton. In 2019, DeLong said that he and other neoliberals had been "certainly wrong, 100 percent, on the politics" of economic policies. While he continued to believe that "good incremental policies" might be superior, he concluded that they were politically unattainable because of the lack of Republicans willing to work toward such goals. Instead, DeLong said that he favored "Medicare for all, funded by a carbon tax, with a whole bunch of Universal Basic Income rebates for the poor and public investment in green technologies." He concluded, "The world appears to be more like what lefties thought it was than what I thought it was for the last 10 or 15 years."

DeLong is an active blogger on political and economic issues and media criticism. In 2022, he published Slouching Towards Utopia, an economic history of the 20th century from a Keynesian perspective.

== Personal life ==
DeLong lives in Berkeley, California, with his wife, Ann Marie Marciarille, a professor of law (specializing in healthcare law) at the University of Missouri-Kansas City.

== Publications ==
- Slouching Towards Utopia (2022 Basic Books -- 605 pp economic history from 1870 through 2010 detailing phenomenal growth in wealth and failure to achieve social justice.)
- "Noise Trader Risk in Financial Markets" (Journal of Political Economy, 1990; co-authored with Andrei Shleifer, Lawrence Summers, and Robert Waldmann)
- "Equipment Investment and Economic Growth" (Quarterly Journal of Economics, May 1991; co-authored with Lawrence Summers)
- "In Defense of Mexico's Rescue" (Foreign Affairs, 1996; co-authored with Christopher DeLong and Sherman Robinson)
- "Princes and Merchants: European City Growth before the Industrial Revolution" (Journal of Law and Economics 1993; co-authored with Andrei Shleifer)
- "The Marshall Plan: History's Most Successful Structural Adjustment Programme" (in R. Dornbusch et al., eds., Postwar Economic Reconstruction and Lessons for the East, Cambridge: M.I.T., 1993; co-authored with Barry Eichengreen) doi:10.3386/w3899
- "Between Meltdown and Moral Hazard: The International Monetary and Financial Policy of the Clinton Administration" (co-authored with Barry J. Eichengreen)
- "Review of Robert Skidelsky (2000), John Maynard Keynes, volume 3, Fighting for Britain" (Journal of Economic Literature, 2002)
- "The Triumph of Monetarism?" (Journal of Economic Perspectives, 2000)
- "Asset Returns and Economic Growth" (Brookings Papers on Economic Activity, 2005; co-authored with Dean Baker and Paul Krugman)
- "Productivity Growth in the 2000s" (NBER Macroeconomics Annual 2003)
- "The New Economy: Background, Questions, Speculations" (Economic Policies for the Information Age, 2002; co-authored with Lawrence Summers)
- "Speculative Microeconomics for Tomorrow's Economy" (First Monday, 2000; co-authored with Michael Froomkin)
- "America's Peacetime Inflation" (in Reducing Inflation, 1998)
- "Keynesianism Pennsylvania-Avenue Style" (Journal of Economic Perspectives, 1996)
- "Productivity and Machinery Investment: A Long-Run Look, 1870-1980" (Journal of Economic History, June 1992)
- "The Stock Market Bubble of 1929: Evidence from Closed-End Funds" (Journal of Economic History, September 1991; co-authored with Andrei Shleifer)
