= Ellora Derenoncourt =

American economist

Ellora Derenoncourt (/dəˈrɛnənkɔːrt/ də-REN-ən-kort) is an American economist. She is an assistant professor of economics in the Industrial Relations Section of the Department of Economics at Princeton University and a member of the Industrial Relations Section of Princeton Economics. She was previously at the Department of Economics and assistant professor of Public Policy at the Goldman School of Public Policy at UC Berkeley. Her work focuses on labor economics, economic history and the study of inequality. Her research on racial inequality in the United States has been featured on NPR, New York Times, and The Wall Street Journal. She received a MacArthur Fellowship in 2026.

== Education ==
Derenoncourt graduated from Harvard University with a Bachelor of Arts in Gender studies and a minor in molecular biology. In 2011 she received her master's degree in Science in Human Geography Research from the London School of Economics and got her Ph.D. in Economics from Harvard University. She was also a visiting student at the UC Berkeley Center for Equitable Growth from 2016 to 2017.

== Research ==
Her work on racial inequality has focused on the gaps in earnings by race and on the evolution of racial inequality in the 20th century. She has examined the backlash in the northern U.S. states toward the Great Migration and the resulting problems in black upward mobility. Her paper with Claire Montialoux demonstrates the role minimum wage played in racial income disparities between black and white workers in the United States in the late 1960s and early 1970s, where the expansion of the minimum wage in 1967 accounted for a 20% of the decrease in racial income gaps.

Currently, Derenoncourt is working on her research on the economic history of institutions and the economics of inequality.

== Awards ==
She was awarded the Economic History Association's Allan Nevins Prize for best dissertation in 2019 for her work in American Economic history. She is one of the CIFAR Azrieli Global Scholars for the 2021-2023 cohort. In 2026, Derenoncourt was named a MacArthur Fellow for her research on the origins of racial wealth disparities in the United States.

== Selected works ==
- Derenoncourt, Ellora (2018). "20. The Historical Origins of Global Inequality". In Boushey, H.; DeLong, J.; Steinbaum, M. (eds.). After Piketty : The Agenda for Economics and Inequality. Cambridge, MA: Harvard University Press. pp. 491–511. doi:10.4159/9780674978195-021. ISBN 978-0-674-97819-5.
- Derenoncourt, E., Bahn, K., & Montialoux, C. (2020). Why minimum wages are a critical tool for achieving racial justice in the U.S. labor market. WCEG Issue Brief.
- Derenoncourt, E., & Montialoux, C. (2020). Opinion | To Reduce Racial Inequality, Raise the Minimum Wage. Nytimes.com. Retrieved June 3, 2021.
