= Internal debt =

National debt owed to lenders within the country

In public finance, internal debt or domestic debt is the component of the total government debt in a country that is owed to lenders within the country. Internal government debt is complement is external government debt. The main sources of funds for internal debts are commercial banks and other financial institutions.

Internal public debt owed by a government (money a government borrows from its citizens) is part of the country's national debt. It is a form of fiat creation of money, in which the government obtains finance not by creating it de novo, but by borrowing it. The money created is in the form of treasury securities or securities borrowed from the central bank.

These may be traded but will only rarely be spent on goods and services. In this way, the expected increase in inflation due to the increase in national wealth is lower than if the government had simply created the money de novo and increased the more liquid forms of wealth (i.e., the money supply).
