= Heather Boushey =

American economist (born 1970)

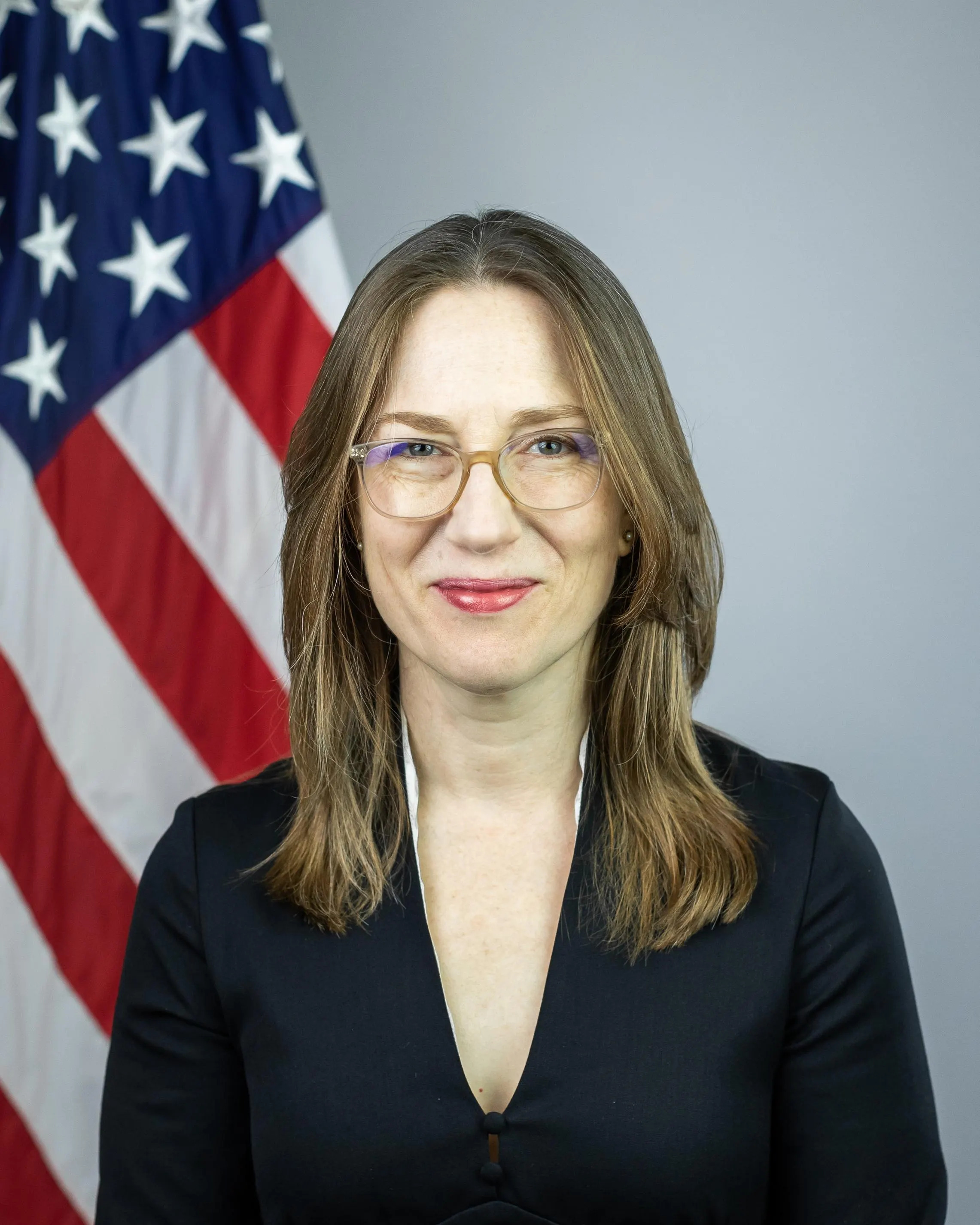
- Official portrait, 2021

Member of the Council of Economic Advisers
- In office January 20, 2021 – January 20, 2025
- President: Joe Biden
- Preceded by: Tyler Goodspeed

Personal details
- Born: Heather Marie Boushey; 1970 (age 55–56) Seattle, Washington, U.S.
- Spouse: Todd Tucker
- Education: Hampshire College (BA); The New School (MA, PhD)

Heather Marie Boushey (born 1970) is an American labor economist who served as a member of President Joe Biden's Council of Economic Advisers and the Chief Economist for the Invest in America Cabinet at the White House.

Prior to joining the Biden-Harris Administration, she was the president and CEO of the Washington Center for Equitable Growth, which she co-founded with John Podesta. She has also worked as an economist at the Center for American Progress, the United States Congress Joint Economic Committee, the Center for Economic and Policy Research and the Economic Policy Institute. She has written for a variety of publications, including the New York Times, Washington Post, Democracy Journal, and the American Prospect. She regularly appears in the media to discuss economic issues.

The New York Times has called Boushey one of the “most vibrant voices in the field,” and laid out how she is “at the forefront of a generation of economists rethinking their discipline.” Politico has twice named her one of the top 50 “thinkers, doers and visionaries transforming American politics.”

== Early life and education ==
Boushey was born in Seattle and grew up in Mukilteo, Washington. She earned her bachelor's degree from Hampshire College and her Ph.D. in economics from The New School for Social Research.

== Career ==
Boushey's work focuses on the relation between inequality and economic growth. She previously served as an economist for the Center for American Progress, the United States Congress Joint Economic Committee, the Center for Economic and Policy Research, and the Economic Policy Institute.

In 2013, Boushey and John Podesta launched the Washington Center for Equitable Growth, a DC-based research organization at the Center for American Progress, also founded by Podesta. In the year when Boushey resigned to join the Biden-Harris Administration, the organization had a budget of $10 million and the organization had awarded over $6 million in grants to nearly 200 academics nationwide.

Boushey was part of a team advising Hillary Clinton on her economic agenda during her presidential campaign, where she advised her on how to address inequality and a menu of policies to build up the care economy. In July 2016, Boushey was announced as chief economist on the Clinton-Kaine transition following the Democratic National Convention.

Boushey is widely seen as one of the architects of the President's “middle out” approach to boosting economic growth and part of a slate of economic advisers that commentators saw as signifying a shift in direction for economic policy, which was hailed as a win for progressives. In August 2020, Boushey was featured in a New York Times article focusing on her role in the Biden presidential campaign and the work that she and Equitable Growth have been doing in the wake of COVID-19. Shortly after Biden's victory in November 2020, it was announced that Boushey would serve as a member of Biden's Council of Economic Advisers where she helped articulate his economic agenda. In February 2023, President Biden appointed her to Chief Economist for his newly-formed Invest in America Cabinet. In that role, she helped articulate the economic theory of the case for the invest in America agenda and traveled the country, connecting with communities directly benefiting from the President's economic agenda. After Boushey's role in the Biden administration was announced, Claudia Sahm, a former employee at Equitable Growth, accused her of mismanagement. Equitable Growth denied Sahm's account.

Boushey has often testified before the U.S. Congress, written for popular media, including The New York Times, The Atlantic, and Democracy Journal, and makes frequent television appearances on Bloomberg, MSNBC, CNBC, and PBS.

Boushey previously sat on the board of the Opportunity Institute. She was a senior fellow at the Schwartz Center for Economic and Policy Analysis at the New School for Social Research, and a Research Affiliate with the National Poverty Center at the Gerald R. Ford School of Public Policy. She has been an associate editor of Feminist Economics, and on the editorial review board of WorkingUSA and the Journal of Poverty.

=== Analysis of women's participation in the labor force ===
In response to a series of articles in the New York Times that claimed that highly educated women were dropping out of the labor force because of "the motherhood movement", Boushey published results of econometric analysis that showed that the opposite was true and that these women, along with women and workers in the economy as a whole, were merely suffering the effects of the U.S. recession and jobless recovery. Bureau of Labor Statistics economists Emy Sok and Sharon Cohany found that, in 2005, the participation rate of married mothers with preschoolers was 60%, about 4 percentage points lower than its peak in 1997 and 1998. Economist Saul Hoffman found that, between 1984 and 2004, the presence of children has had a smaller negative impact on the labor force participation of all women aged 25–44 years. This finding confirms Boushey's report of a declining child penalty. However, this effect varies greatly by marital status: The labor force participation rate of single mothers aged 25–44 years increased 9 percentage points between 1993 and 2000, while the rate for single women aged 25–44 years with children aged 5 years or younger jumped a full 14 percentage points over the same period. In contrast, the labor force participation rate for married mothers increased 1 percentage point, and the rate for married women with children aged 5 years or younger was flat.

== Personal life ==
On March 31, 2007, Boushey married Todd Tucker, Director, Industrial Policy and Trade at the Roosevelt Institute.

== Selected publications ==
- Boushey, Heather (2016). Finding Time: The Economics of Work-Life Conflict. Harvard University Press. ISBN 978-0-674-24149-7. OCLC 1090007320.
- Boushey, Heather (2019). Unbound: How Inequality Constricts Our Economy and What We Can Do About It. Harvard University Press. ISBN 978-0-674-91931-0. OCLC 1090012216.
