= Funding Act of 1790 =

1790 U.S. law creating a national system to resolve the individual states' debts

- Long title: An Act making provision for the [payment of the] Debt of the United States
- Nicknames: Assumption Act
- Enacted by: the 1st United States Congress
- Effective: August 4, 1790

Citations
- Statutes at Large: 1 Stat. 138

Legislative history
- Signed into law by President George Washington on August 4, 1790

The Funding Act of 1790, the full title of which is An Act making provision for the [payment of the] Debt of the United States, was passed on August 4, 1790, by the United States Congress as part of the Compromise of 1790, to address the issue of funding (debt service, repayment, and retirement) of the domestic debt incurred by the state governments, first as Thirteen Colonies, then as states in rebellion, in independence, in Confederation, and finally as members of a single federal Union. By the Act, the newly-inaugurated federal government under the U.S. Constitution assumed and thereby retired the debts of each of the individual colonies in rebellion and the bonded debts of the States in Confederation, which each state had individually and independently issued on its own "full faith and credit" when each of them was, in effect, an independent nation.

Through the new Department of the Treasury, the U.S. government issued U.S. Treasury Securities backed by the "full faith and credit" of the United States and offered them to the bondholders of the former States' and Confederation's bonded debts at par—that is, at 100% of the state bonds' face value (full assumption) and at rates of interest (and all other terms) that were as specified on the bonds when they were issued by the states and Confederation.

When that was done, "full assumption" of state debts by the federal government had thereby occurred through the issue of federal securities and, for the states of the new Union, the full and complete retirement of their bonded obligations incurred in the Revolution and the Confederation.

== Background ==
With the formation of the new government in 1789 under the recently adopted U.S. Constitution, the settlement of the Revolutionary War debt was a matter of prime importance. As a result, the first House of Representatives directed the first Secretary of the Treasury, Alexander Hamilton, during the presidential administration of George Washington, to draw up a plan for the support of public credit. Consequently, the First Report on the Public Credit was issued on January 9, 1790, which became the foundation for subsequent action taken by Congress for funding and paying the public debt. The Funding Act of 1790 that followed was concerned primarily with funding the domestic debt held by the states.

== Content ==
The Funding Act authorized the federal government to receive certificates of state war-incurred debts and to issue federal securities in exchange. It essentially proposed “a loan to the full amount of the said domestic debt.”

The terms of the loan were that two-thirds of the principal of the debt subscribed should draw the interest of 6% per annum, from January 1, 1791, and the remaining one-third of the principal to receive interest at the same rate (6%) from 1801, with interest “payable quarter yearly”. The debt consisting of arrears of interest should bear an interest of 3% from January 1, 1791.

By the Act, Congress authorized the assumption of a total of $21.5 million of state debts as follows:

State	Debt amount authorized for assumption
New Hampshire	$300,000
Massachusetts	$4,000,000
Rhode Island and Providence Plantations	$200,000
Connecticut	$1,600,000
New York	$1,200,000
New Jersey	$800,000
Pennsylvania	$2,200,000
Delaware	$200,000
Maryland	$800,000
Virginia	$3,500,000
North Carolina	$2,400,000
South Carolina	$4,000,000
Georgia	$300,000

Not all of the state quotas were filled and so the total assumed was only $18.3 million. Furthermore, although the Act was limited to one year, it was later extended until the entire debt was subscribed and funded according to the law.

This sum was also to be loaned to the United States with the terms such that each subscriber was to be entitled to a certificate equivalent of four ninths of the sum subscribed, bearing interest at 6% per annum, another certificate equal to three-ninths of the sum subscribed bearing interest at 3% with both commencing January 1, 1792, and a third certificate of the remaining two ninths of the sum bearing 6% interest starting from the year 1800.

The Act also provided for the funding of securities issued by the Confederation into new federal issues. State governments had acquired nearly $9 million of the $27.5 million of Confederation debt outstanding in 1789. The law provided that for every $90 worth of principal turned in, there should be issued $60 worth of 6% stock and $30 of deferred that would bear interest after 1801. Arrears of interest were funded into 3% stock.

Finally, the funding program resulted in the settlement of accounts between the states and the national government completed in 1793. That was intended to equalize the per capita burden of war expenditures among the states. Each state was credited with the amount it spent during the war and debited for sums received from the federal government.

== Effects ==
The shedding of the state debt burden allowed the states to reduce taxes, resulting in the lowering of taxes in many states including Maryland, Pennsylvania, New York, Virginia and Massachusetts. However, that was associated with a subsequent imposition of federal taxes, effectively leaving the status quo unchanged. The Funding Act left the states with substantial revenue earned through the federal securities, with income from this source making up nearly one-fifth of total state revenue. That income enabled states to invest in industry and promote economic enterprises directly.

== See also ==
- Sinking fund
- Funding Act of 1870
- History of the United States public debt

== Bibliography ==
- Cohen, Bernard. Compendium of finance : containing an account of the origin, progress, and present state, of the public debts, revenue, expenditure, national banks and currencies ... and shewing the nature of the different public securities, with the manner of making investments therein : also, an historical sketch of the national debt of the British Empire, authenticated by official documents – 2d ed. 2nd ed. London, 1828. The Making of the Modern World. Gale 2011. Gale, Cengage Learning. Yale University. 28 February 2011 <http://galenet.galegroup.com/servlet/MOME?af=RN&ae=U105090144&srchtp=a&ste=14>
- Trescott, Paul. Federal–State Financial Relations 1790–1860. The Journal of Economic History, Vol. 15, No. 3 (Sep., 1955), pp. 227–245. Cambridge University Press on behalf of the Economic History Association. JSTOR 2114655.
- Garber, Peter (1991). "Alexander Hamilton's market based debt reduction plan" (PDF). Carnegie-Rochester Conference Series on Public Policy. 35 (1). North-Holland Publishing Company: 79–104. doi:10.1016/0167-2231(91)90020-6. ISSN 0167-2231. S2CID 154324633. via Garber, Peter (January 1991). "Alexander Hamilton's Market Based Debt Reduction Plan". NBER Working Paper No. 3597. doi:10.3386/w3597.
- Syrett, Harrold et al., eds., The Papers of Alexander Hamilton, 27 vols. (New York, i96i–i987), VI, 65–66, 86.
- Swanson, Donald and Trout, Andrew. Alexander Hamilton's Hidden Sinking Fund. The William and Mary Quarterly, Third Series, Vol. 49, No. 1 (Jan., 1992), pp. 108–116 JSTOR 2947337.
- Funding Act of 1790 Date of Publication: 1790 Early American Imprints, Series 1, no. 46047 (filmed) Title: [Bill. 1790] An act making provision for the debt of the United States. Also available at Wikisource.
