= Compromise of 1790 =

United States political compromise

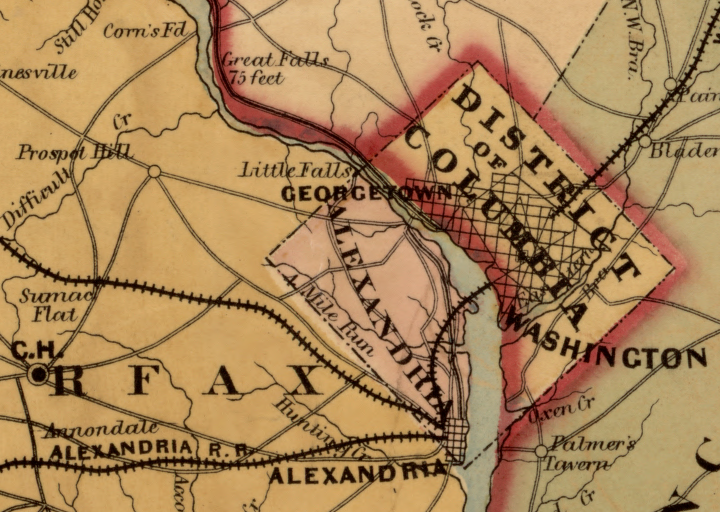
- Map showing the location of Washington, D.C., a direct result of the compromise.
- Date: June 20, 1790
- Location: New York City, New York, U.S.
- Participants: Alexander Hamilton; Thomas Jefferson; James Madison
- Outcome: Resolution of congressional deadlock; Passage of the Residence Act (moving the U.S. capital to the South); Passage of the Funding Act of 1790 (federal assumption of state war debts)

The Compromise of 1790 was a compromise among Alexander Hamilton, Thomas Jefferson, and James Madison, where Hamilton won the decision for the national government to take over and pay the state debts, and Jefferson and Madison obtained the national capital, called the District of Columbia, for the South. This agreement resolved the deadlock in Congress. Southerners had been blocking the assumption of state debts by the Department of the Treasury, thereby destroying the Hamiltonian program for building a fiscally strong federal government. Northerners rejected the proposal, much desired by Southerners, to locate the permanent national capital on the Virginia–Maryland border.

The compromise is believed to have made possible the passage of the Residence Act and Funding Act of 1790 in July and August 1790. According to historian Jacob Cooke, it is "generally regarded as one of the most important bargains in American history, ranking just below the better known Missouri Compromise and the Compromise of 1850," though Cooke himself challenges the idea that Hamilton, Jefferson, and Madison actually pulled off the terms of the compromise in the end.

== Meeting ==
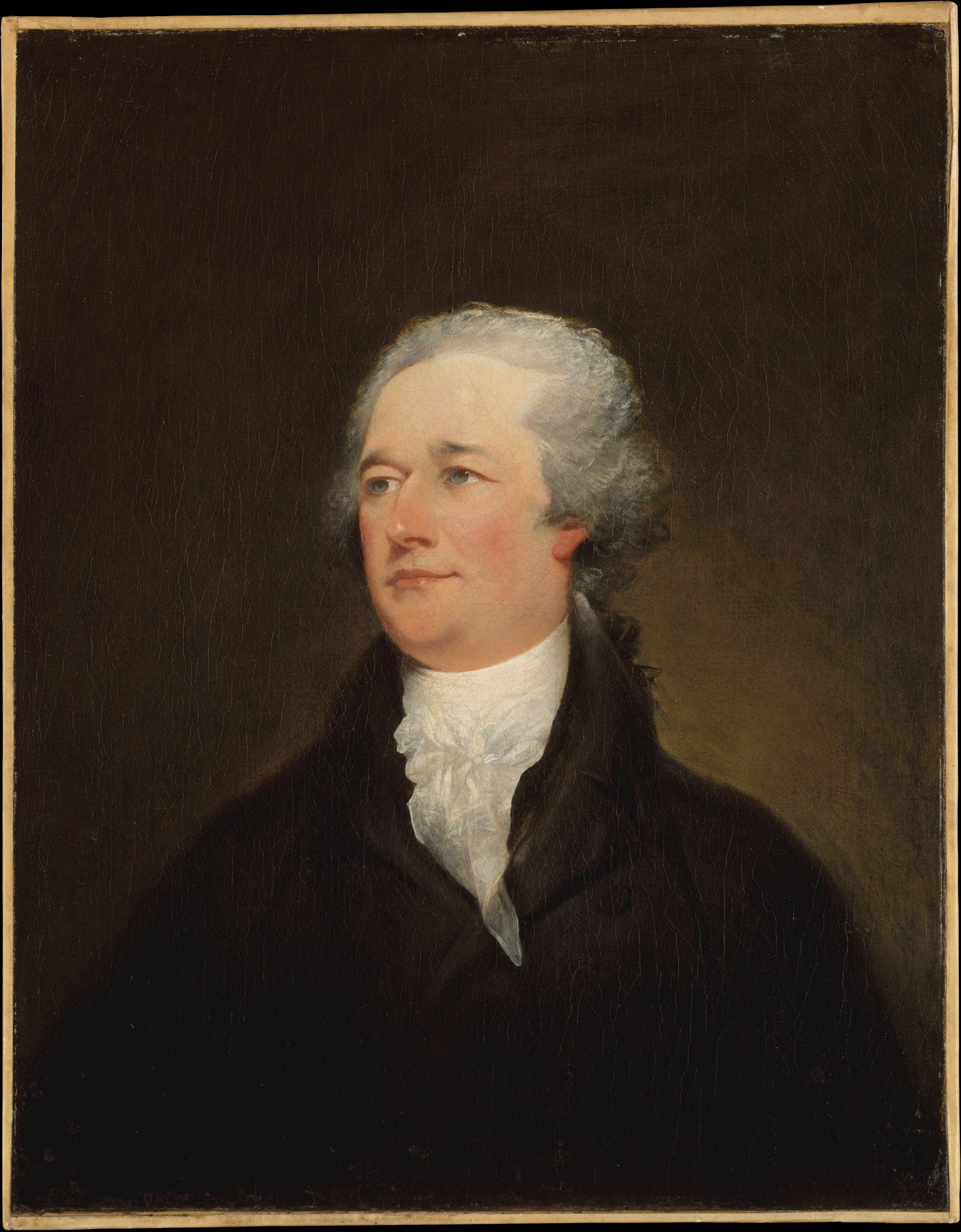
Alexander Hamilton

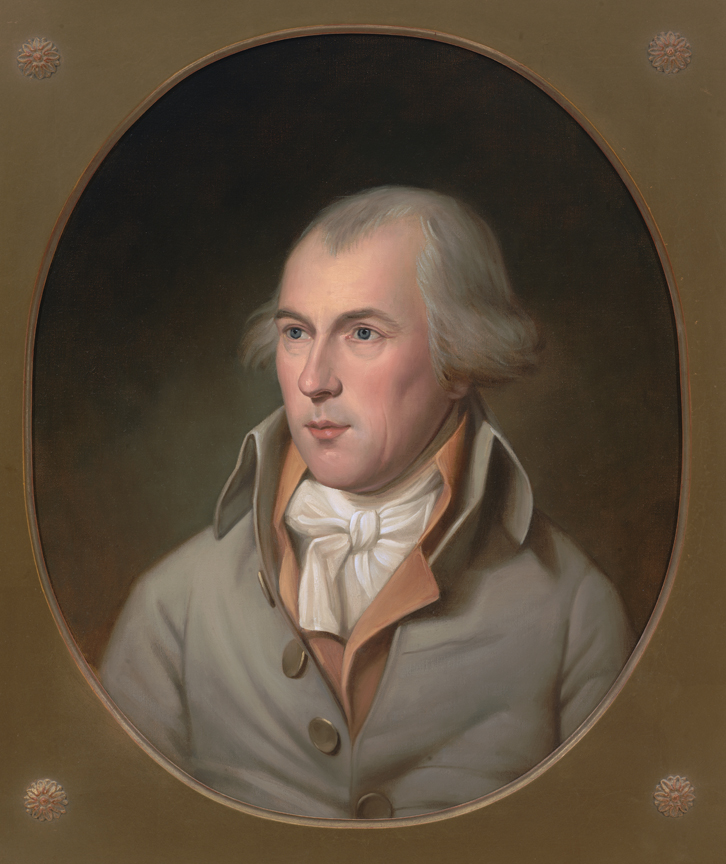
James Madison

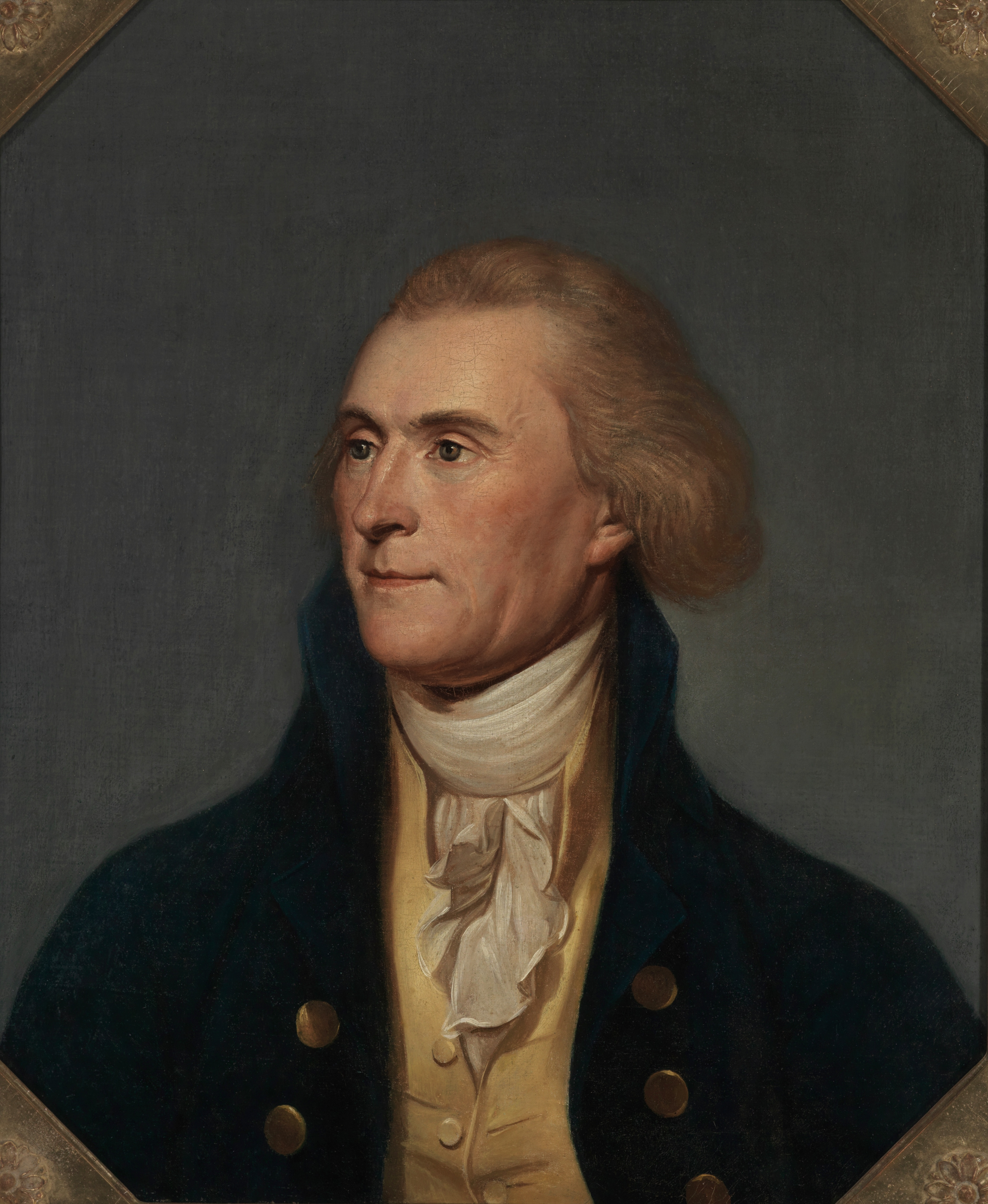
Thomas Jefferson

Politicians at the federal and the state levels sought to break the legislative deadlock by unofficial negotiations. A number of clandestine meetings and political dinners were held in New York City, then serving as the nation's temporary capital, in the summer of 1790.

The "dinner table bargain" was a pivotal episode in the final stages of these compromise efforts. Based on an account given by former Secretary of State Thomas Jefferson, two years after the event, the "dinner" was a private meeting between Secretary of the Treasury Alexander Hamilton and U.S. House of Representatives member James Madison. Shortly after the Assumption Bill failed for a second time in June in the House, Hamilton, despairing that his financial plan would be scuttled, appealed to the newly appointed Jefferson to apply his influence on the matter. According to Jefferson's account, he arranged the dinner for the two officials at his residence in New York City on or about June 20, 1790. The meeting produced a political settlement on the "assumption" and "residency" crisis.

Jefferson described the encounter between the men at his lodgings in New York City:

"It ended in Mr. Madison's acquiescence in a proposition that the question [i.e., assumption of state debts] should be again brought before the house by way of amendment from the Senate, that he would not vote for it, nor entirely withdraw his opposition, yet he would not be strenuous, but leave it to its fate. It was observed, I forget by which of them, that as the pill would be a bitter one to the Southern states, something should be done to soothe them; and the removal of the seat of government to the [Potomac] was a just measure, and would probably be a popular one with them, and would be a proper one to follow the assumption."

The key provision of Secretary Hamilton's First Report on the Public Credit won approval with the passage of the Assumption Act, establishing the foundation for public credit. The Residence Act resulted in the permanent U.S. capital being located in the agrarian states of Maryland and Virginia, the demographic center of the country at the time, rather than in a metropolitan and financial center such as New York City or Philadelphia. Jefferson and Madison secured a lucrative debt adjustment for their state of Virginia from Hamilton, as part of the bargain.

The dinner-table bargain itself is undisputed, but Cooke argues that "the bargain worked out by Jefferson, Madison, and Hamilton was not consummated" and that "each measure had passed on its merits, and doubtless would have succeeded had Jefferson, Madison, and Hamilton not struck a bargain a month or so earlier." Historian Kenneth R. Bowling published a rebuttal to Cooke's argument.

== Assumption ==
Historian Max M. Edling says that assumption worked by using the location of the capital as a bargaining ploy. Alexander Hamilton proposed that the federal Treasury take over and pay off the debt states had incurred to pay for the American Revolutionary War. The Treasury would issue bonds that rich people would buy, thereby giving the rich a tangible stake in the success of the national government. Hamilton proposed to pay off the new bonds with revenue from a new tariff on imports. Jefferson originally approved the scheme, but Madison had turned him around by arguing that federal control of debt would consolidate too much power in the national government.

Edling pointed out that after its passage in 1790, the assumption was accepted. James Madison tried to pay speculators below 100%, but they were paid the face value of the state debts they held regardless of how little they had paid for them. When Jefferson became president, he continued the system. The credit of the U.S. was solidly established at home and abroad, and Hamilton was successful in signing up many of the bondholders in his new Federalist Party. Good credit allowed Thomas Jefferson's Treasury Secretary, Albert Gallatin, to borrow in Europe to finance the Louisiana Purchase in 1803, and to borrow to finance the War of 1812.

== In popular culture ==
The compromise is dramatized in the musical Hamilton by Lin-Manuel Miranda in the song "The Room Where It Happens", which tells the story from the perspective of Aaron Burr, a bystander of this compromise who was not privy to the conversations at the negotiation.

== See also ==
- First Report on the Public Credit
- Residence Act

== Sources ==
- Brock, W.R. 1957. The Ideas and Influence of Alexander Hamilton in Essays on the Early Republic: 1789–1815. Ed. Leonard W. Levy and Carl Siracusa. New York: Holt, Rinehart and Winston, 1974.
- Burstein, Andrew and Isenberg, Nancy. 2010. Madison and Jefferson. New York: Random House
- Cooke, Jacob E. "The Compromise of 1790." William and Mary Quarterly 27 (October 1970): 523–545. in JSTOR
- Ellis, Joseph J. 2000. Founding Brothers: The Revolutionary Generation. Alfred A. Knopf. New York. ISBN 0-375-40544-5
- Malone, Dumas and Rauch, Basil. 1960. Empire for Liberty: The Genesis and Growth of the United States of America. Appleton-Century Crofts, Inc. New York.
- Staloff, Darren. 2005. Hamilton, Adams, Jefferson: The Politics of Enlightenment and the American Founding. Hill and Wang, New York. ISBN 0-8090-7784-1
- https://www.telegraph.co.uk/theatre/what-to-see/hamilton-musical-show-watch-disney-plus-uk-2021/#:~:text=Officially%20titled%20Hamilton%3A%20An%20American,the%20American%20War%20of%20Independence.

== Bibliography ==
- Bordewich, Fergus M. The First Congress: How James Madison, George Washington, and a Group of Extraordinary Men Invented the Government (2016) on 1789–91.
- Clinton, Joshua D., and Adam Meirowitz. "Testing explanations of strategic voting in legislatures: A reexamination of the compromise of 1790." American Journal of Political Science 48.4 (2004): 675–689.
- Risjord, Norman K. "The Compromise of 1790: New Evidence on the Dinner Table Bargain." William and Mary Quarterly 33 (April 1976): 309–314. in JSTOR
