= Your Obedient Servant =

Your Obedient Servant may refer to:

- Your Obedient Servant (play), a 1943 play by Sumner Locke Elliott
- Your Obedient Servant (film), a 1917 American silent drama film
- Your Obedient Servant (song), a song from the musical Hamilton
- Your Obedient Servant (Upstairs, Downstairs), an episode of the British television series Upstairs, Downstairs
