= Hamilton (musical) =

2015 biographical musical by Lin-Manuel Miranda

- An American Musical
- The Broadway promotional poster for Hamilton
- Music: Lin-Manuel Miranda
- Lyrics: Lin-Manuel Miranda
- Book: Lin-Manuel Miranda
- Basis: Alexander Hamilton by Ron Chernow
- Premiere: January 20, 2015: The Public Theater, New York City
- Productions: 2015 Off-Broadway; 2015 Broadway; 2017 First North America tour 2017 West End; 2018 Second North America tour 2019 Third North America tour 2021 Australia; 2021 Fourth North America tour 2022 Hamburg; 2023 International Tour; 2023 UK & Ireland Tour
- Awards: List of awards • Tony Award for Best Musical • Tony Award for Best Book of a Musical • Tony Award for Best Original Score • Grammy Award for Best Musical Theater Album • Laurence Olivier Award for Best New Musical • Laurence Olivier Award for Outstanding Achievement in Music • Obie Award for Best New American Theatre Work • Pulitzer Prize for Drama

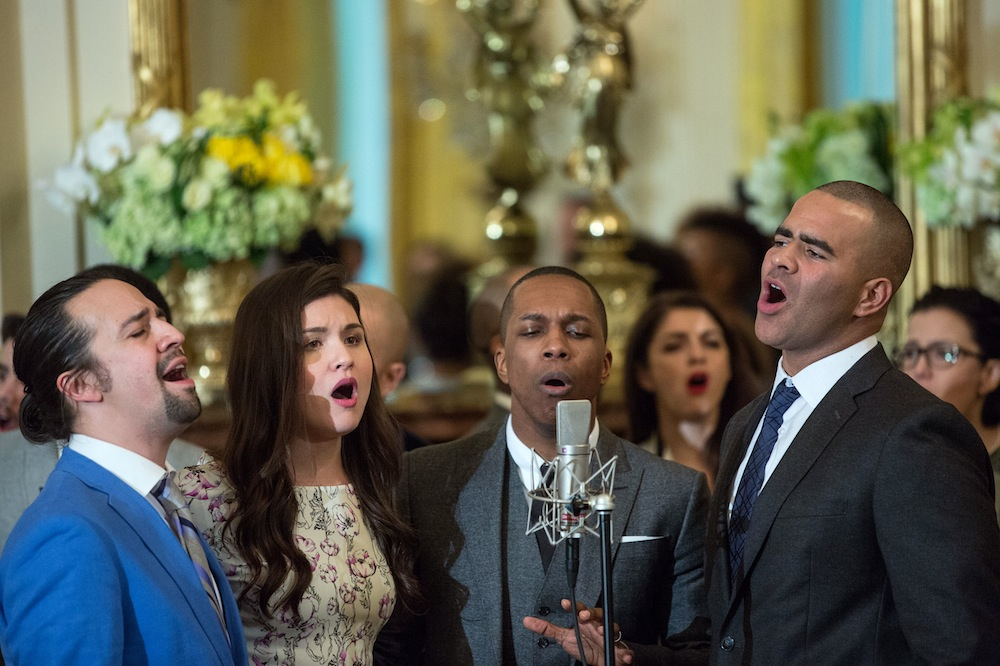
Cast members perform selections from the musical at the White House in 2016. Left to right: Lin-Manuel Miranda, Phillipa Soo, Leslie Odom Jr., and Christopher Jackson

Hamilton: An American Musical, known simply as Hamilton, is a sung-and-rapped-through biographical musical with music, lyrics, and a book by Lin-Manuel Miranda. Based on the 2004 biography Alexander Hamilton by Ron Chernow, the musical covers the life of American Founding Father Alexander Hamilton and his involvement in the American Revolution and the political history of the early United States. Composed from 2008 to 2015, the music draws heavily from hip hop, as well as R&B, pop, soul, and traditional-style show tunes. It casts non-white actors as the Founding Fathers of the United States and other historical figures. Miranda described Hamilton as about "America then, as told by America now".

From its opening, Hamilton received near-universal acclaim. It premiered off-Broadway on February 17, 2015, at the Public Theater in Lower Manhattan, with Miranda playing the role of Alexander Hamilton, where its several-month engagement was sold out. The musical won eight Drama Desk Awards, including Outstanding Musical. It then transferred to the Richard Rodgers Theatre on Broadway, opening on August 6, 2015, where it received uniformly positive reviews and high box office sales. At the 70th Tony Awards, Hamilton received a record-breaking 16 nominations and won 11 awards, including Best Musical. It received the 2016 Pulitzer Prize for Drama. In 2020, a filmed version of the Broadway production was released on Disney+, followed by a theatrical release in 2025 by Walt Disney Pictures.

The Chicago production of Hamilton began preview performances at the CIBC Theatre in September 2016 and opened the following month. The West End production opened at the Victoria Palace Theatre in London on December 21, 2017, following previews from December 6, winning seven Olivier Awards in 2018, including Best New Musical. The first U.S. national tour began in March 2017. A second U.S. tour opened in February 2018. Hamilton's third U.S. tour began on January 11, 2019, with a three-week engagement in Puerto Rico in which Miranda returned to the role of Hamilton. The first non-English production opened in Hamburg in October 2022 for which it had been translated into German. As of 2026, no amateur or professional licenses have been granted for Hamilton.

== Synopsis ==
Hamilton narrates Alexander Hamilton's life in two acts, and details among other things his involvement in the American Revolutionary War as an aide-de-camp to George Washington, his marriage to Eliza Schuyler, his career as a lawyer and Secretary of the Treasury, and his interactions with Aaron Burr (the main narrator for most of the musical), which culminates in their duel that ends Hamilton's life.

=== Act I ===
The orphan Alexander Hamilton experiences a difficult early life, but through his wits and the charity of the people of his hometown, he escapes his home—the island of St. Croix—and immigrates to New York City ("Alexander Hamilton"). As a student at King's College in 1776, Hamilton meets Aaron Burr, John Laurens, the Marquis de Lafayette, and Hercules Mulligan ("Aaron Burr, Sir"), and impresses them with his rhetorical skills ("My Shot"). The latter three and Hamilton affirm their revolutionary goals to each other, while Burr remains apprehensive ("The Story of Tonight"). Later, the daughters of the wealthy Philip Schuyler—Peggy, Angelica, and Eliza—go into town and share their excitement about the upcoming revolution ("The Schuyler Sisters"), while loyalist bishop Samuel Seabury argues against the revolution ("Farmer Refuted") and King George III insists on his authority ("You'll Be Back"). During the New York and New Jersey campaign, Hamilton accepts a position as George Washington's aide-de-camp despite longing for field command ("Right Hand Man").

At a ball hosted by Philip Schuyler ("A Winter's Ball"), Eliza falls helplessly in love with Hamilton, who reciprocates her feelings to the point of marriage ("Helpless"), as Angelica suppresses her own feelings for the sake of their happiness ("Satisfied"). After the wedding, Burr and Hamilton congratulate each other's successes ("The Story of Tonight (Reprise)"), and Burr reflects on Hamilton's swift rise compared to his own more cautious career, as well as his affair with Theodosia, the wife of a British officer ("Wait for It").

As conditions worsen for the Continental Army with the Battle of Monmouth ("Stay Alive"), Hamilton aids Laurens in a duel against disgraced Major General Charles Lee ("Ten Duel Commandments"), for which Washington suspends him from the army ("Meet Me Inside"). Back home, Eliza reveals that she is pregnant with their first child, Philip, and asks Hamilton to slow down to take in the good that has happened in their lives ("That Would Be Enough"). Lafayette convinces Washington to recall Hamilton and grant him field command for the Battle of Yorktown ("Guns and Ships"). Knowing that Hamilton would die a martyr, Washington tells him that he should carefully consider his actions because whatever he does will be remembered for all time ("History Has Its Eyes on You"). At Yorktown, Hamilton works with Lafayette to take down the British and reveals that Mulligan has been working as a spy, helping them trap the British and win the war ("Yorktown (The World Turned Upside Down)").

Soon after the victory of Yorktown, King George asks the newborn America how it will succeed on its own ("What Comes Next?"). Hamilton's son Philip is born, while Burr has a daughter, Theodosia, and the two new fathers promise their children that they will do anything to protect them ("Dear Theodosia"). Hamilton receives word that Laurens has been killed in a pointless battle with evacuating British troops after the war was already over and responds to his grief by throwing himself into his work ("Tomorrow There'll Be More of Us (The Laurens Interlude)"). Over the next decade, both Hamilton and Burr return to New York and work as lawyers. Through his work and writing, Hamilton rapidly gains influence, participates in the Constitutional Convention, co-authors The Federalist Papers and is selected as Secretary of the Treasury by newly elected President Washington, amidst Eliza begging him to slow down and Angelica moving to London with her new husband ("Non-Stop").

=== Act II ===
In 1789, Thomas Jefferson returns to America from being the U.S. ambassador to France, taking up his newfound position as Secretary of State ("What'd I Miss"). Jefferson and James Madison debate against Hamilton's financial proposals at a Cabinet meeting. Washington orders Hamilton to figure out a compromise to push his plan through Congress ("Cabinet Battle #1"). Eliza and her family—along with Angelica, visiting from London—travel upstate during the summer, while Hamilton stays home to work on the compromise ("Take a Break"). Hamilton begins an affair with Maria Reynolds, making him vulnerable to her husband's extortion ("Say No to This"). Hamilton, Jefferson, and Madison finally reach a compromise over a private dinner: they will push through Hamilton's financial plan in exchange for placing the country's permanent capital on the Potomac River. Burr is envious of Hamilton's sway in the government and wishes that he had similar power ("The Room Where It Happens"). Burr switches political parties and defeats Hamilton's father-in-law Philip Schuyler in a race for the Senate, now making Hamilton a rival ("Schuyler Defeated").

In another Cabinet meeting, Jefferson and Hamilton argue over whether the United States should assist France in its conflict with Britain. President Washington ultimately agrees with Hamilton's argument for remaining neutral ("Cabinet Battle #2"). In the wake of this, Jefferson, Madison, and Burr decide to join forces to find a way to discredit Hamilton ("Washington on Your Side"). Washington retires from the presidency after his second term, and Hamilton assists in writing his farewell address ("One Last Time"). A flabbergasted King George receives word that George Washington has stepped down, and will be replaced by John Adams ("I Know Him"). Adams fires Hamilton, who, in response, publishes an inflammatory critique of the new president ("The Adams Administration").

Jefferson, Madison, and Burr confront Hamilton about James Reynolds's blackmail years earlier, accusing him of embezzlement ("We Know"). Desperate to salvage his political career by proving that he was merely lustful and not corrupt, Hamilton reminisces over his life and how writing has always saved him ("Hurricane"), before preemptively publicizing his affair in the Reynolds Pamphlet, which wrecks his own reputation ("The Reynolds Pamphlet"). It also ruins his relationship with Eliza, who, in heartbroken retaliation, burns all the letters Hamilton wrote her, trying to erase herself from history ("Burn"). At 19 years old, Hamilton's son Philip attempts to defend his father's honor in a duel with George Eacker ("Blow Us All Away"), but is fatally shot ("Stay Alive (Reprise)"), eventually leading to reconciliation between Alexander and Eliza ("It's Quiet Uptown").

Hamilton's surprising endorsement of longtime political enemy Jefferson over Burr in the 1800 presidential election ("The Election of 1800") dramatically intensifies the animosity between Hamilton and Burr, who reaches his breaking point and challenges Hamilton to a duel via an exchange of letters ("Your Obedient Servant"). Hamilton writes his last letter in a rush while Eliza tells him to go back to bed ("Best of Wives and Best of Women"). Burr reflects on the events leading up to the duel, while Hamilton reflects on his legacy, before firing his bullet up in the air. Burr fatally shoots Hamilton, and laments that though he survived, he is destined to be remembered by history as the villain who killed Hamilton ("The World Was Wide Enough"). The musical closes with a reflection on historical memory. Jefferson and Madison reflect on Hamilton's legacy, while Eliza tells how she reinserted herself in history and ensured Hamilton's memory by recording the memories of fellow veterans, raising funds for the Washington Monument, speaking out against slavery, and establishing the first private orphanage in New York City ("Who Lives, Who Dies, Who Tells Your Story"). Finally, alone on stage, Eliza turns toward the audience and quietly weeps.

== Principal casts ==
=== Original production principal casts ===
Character	Off-Broadway	Broadway (Note: The Original Broadway Cast is also featured in the 2020 film version.)	Chicago	First U.S. Tour	West End	Second U.S. Tour	Third U.S. Tour	Los Angeles	Australia
Character	2015		2016	2017		2018	2019	2021	2021
Alexander Hamilton	Lin-Manuel Miranda	Lin-Manuel Miranda	Miguel Cervantes	Michael Luwoye	Jamael Westman	Joseph Morales	Julius Thomas III Lin-Manuel Miranda (Note: Miranda only performed the title role during a three-week engagement in Puerto Rico.)	Jamael Westman	Jason Arrow
Aaron Burr	Leslie Odom Jr.	Leslie Odom Jr.	Joshua Henry	Joshua Henry	Giles Terera	Nik Walker	Donald Webber Jr.	Nicholas Christopher	Lyndon Watts
Eliza Schuyler Hamilton	Phillipa Soo	Phillipa Soo	Arianna Afsar	Solea Pfeiffer	Rachelle Ann Go	Shoba Narayan	Julia K. Harriman	Joanna A. Jones	Chloè Zuel
Angelica Schuyler	Renée Elise Goldsberry	Renée Elise Goldsberry	Karen Olivo	Emmy Raver-Lampman	Rachel John	Ta'Rea Campbell	Sabrina Sloan	Sabrina Sloan	Akina Edmonds
George Washington	Christopher Jackson	Christopher Jackson	Jonathan Kirkland	Isaiah Johnson	Obioma Ugoala	Marcus Choi	Isaiah Johnson	Carvens Lissaint	Matu Ngaropo
Marquis de Lafayette (Note: Act I)	Daveed Diggs	Daveed Diggs	Chris Lee	Jordan Donica	Jason Pennycooke	Kyle Scatliffe	Simon Longnight	Simon Longnight	Victory Ndukwe
Thomas Jefferson (Note: Act II)	Daveed Diggs	Daveed Diggs	Chris Lee	Jordan Donica	Jason Pennycooke	Kyle Scatliffe	Simon Longnight	Simon Longnight	Victory Ndukwe
John Laurens	Anthony Ramos	Anthony Ramos	Jose Ramos	Rubén J. Carbajal	Cleve September	Elijah Malcomb	Rubén J. Carbajal	Rubén J. Carbajal	Marty Alix
Philip Hamilton	Anthony Ramos	Anthony Ramos	Jose Ramos	Rubén J. Carbajal	Cleve September	Elijah Malcomb	Rubén J. Carbajal	Rubén J. Carbajal	Marty Alix
Hercules Mulligan	Okieriete Onaodowan	Okieriete Onaodowan	Wallace Smith	Mathenee Treco	Tarinn Callender	Fergie L. Philippe	Brandon Armstrong	Wallace Smith	Shaka Cook
James Madison	Okieriete Onaodowan	Okieriete Onaodowan	Wallace Smith	Mathenee Treco	Tarinn Callender	Fergie L. Philippe	Brandon Armstrong	Wallace Smith	Shaka Cook
King George III	Brian d'Arcy James	Jonathan Groff	Alexander Gemignani	Rory O'Malley	Michael Jibson	Jon Patrick Walker	Rick Negrón	Rory O'Malley	Brent Hill
Peggy Schuyler	Jasmine Cephas Jones	Jasmine Cephas Jones	Samantha Marie Ware	Amber Iman	Christine Allado	Danielle Sostre	Darilyn Castillo	Taylor Iman Jones	Elandrah Eramiha
Maria Reynolds	Jasmine Cephas Jones	Jasmine Cephas Jones	Samantha Marie Ware	Amber Iman	Christine Allado	Danielle Sostre	Darilyn Castillo	Taylor Iman Jones	Elandrah Eramiha

==== Off-Broadway ====
- King George III – Jonathan Groff

==== Broadway ====
- Alexander Hamilton – Javier Muñoz, Michael Luwoye, Ryan Vasquez, Miguel Cervantes, Jon Rua (standby)
- Aaron Burr – Brandon Victor Dixon, Daniel Breaker, Jin Ha, Nik Walker, Nicholas Christopher
- Eliza Hamilton – Lexi Lawson, Denée Benton, Krystal Joy Brown
- Angelica Schuyler – Mandy Gonzalez
- George Washington - Nicholas Christopher, Isaiah Johnson
- Marquis de Lafayette/Thomas Jefferson – Seth Stewart, James Monroe Iglehart, Kyle Scatliffe
- Hercules Mulligan/James Madison – Wallace Smith
- John Laurens/Philip Hamilton – Jordan Fisher, Rubén J. Carbajal
- King George III – Andrew Rannells, Rory O'Malley, Taran Killam, Brian d'Arcy James, Euan Morton, Neil Haskell, Jarrod Spector

==== Chicago ====
- Aaron Burr – Wayne Brady, Daniel Breaker, Jin Ha
- Angelica Schuyler – Montego Glover

==== First U.S. Tour ====
- Aaron Burr – Nicholas Christopher
- Eliza Hamilton – Hannah Cruz
- Angelica Schuyler – Sabrina Sloan
- Peggy Schuyler/Maria Reynolds – Isa Briones

==== West End ====
- Alexander Hamilton - Alex Sawyer
- Aaron Burr - Leslie Odom Jr.
- Angelica Schuyler – Allyson Ava-Brown, Ava Brennan, Georgina Onuorah
- Eliza Schuyler-Hamilton - Sharon Rose
- George Washington – Trevor Dion Nicholas
- King George III – Jon Robyns, Daniel Boys
- Peggy Schuyler/Maria Reynolds - Courtney-Mae Briggs

==== Notable Broadway ensemble members ====
- Ariana DeBose (2015–2016, original Broadway cast)
- Ephraim Sykes (2015–2016, original Broadway cast)
- Thayne Jasperson (2015–present, original Broadway cast)
- Jon Rua (2015–2017, original Broadway cast)
- Sasha Hutchings (2015–2016, original Broadway cast)
- JJ Niemann (2025)

== Musical numbers ==
Act I

- "Alexander Hamilton" – Aaron Burr, John Laurens, Thomas Jefferson, James Madison, Alexander Hamilton, Eliza Schuyler, George Washington, Angelica Schuyler, Maria Reynolds, and Company
- "Aaron Burr, Sir" – Hamilton, Burr, Laurens, Marquis de Lafayette, Hercules Mulligan, and Company
- "My Shot" – Hamilton, Laurens, Lafayette, Mulligan, Burr, and Company
- "The Story of Tonight" – Hamilton, Laurens, Mulligan, Lafayette, and Company
- "The Schuyler Sisters" – Angelica, Eliza, Peggy Schuyler, Burr, and Company
- "Farmer Refuted" – Samuel Seabury, Hamilton, Burr, Mulligan, and Company
- "You'll Be Back" – King George III and Company
- "Right Hand Man" – Washington, Hamilton, Burr, Mulligan, and Company
- "A Winter's Ball" – Burr, Hamilton, Laurens, and Company
- "Helpless" – Eliza, Hamilton, Angelica, and Company
- "Satisfied" – Angelica, Laurens, Hamilton, Eliza, and Company
- "The Story of Tonight (Reprise)" – Laurens, Mulligan, Lafayette, Hamilton, and Burr
- "Wait for It" – Burr and Company
- "Stay Alive" – Hamilton, Washington, Laurens, Lafayette, Mulligan, Charles Lee, Eliza, Angelica, and Company (Note: Credited to full company on the original Broadway cast recording.)
- "Ten Duel Commandments" – Laurens, Hamilton, Lee, Burr, and Company
- "Meet Me Inside" – Hamilton, Burr, Laurens, Washington, and Company
- "That Would Be Enough" – Eliza and Hamilton
- "Guns and Ships" – Burr, Lafayette, Washington, and Company
- "History Has Its Eyes on You" – Washington, Hamilton, and Company
- "Yorktown (The World Turned Upside Down)" – Hamilton, Lafayette, Laurens, Mulligan, Washington, and Company
- "What Comes Next?" – King George III
- "Dear Theodosia" – Burr and Hamilton
- "Tomorrow There'll Be More of Us" – Laurens, Eliza, and Hamilton (Note: "Tomorrow There'll Be More of Us", a second reprise to "The Story of Tonight", does not appear on the original Broadway cast recording. Miranda explained that it was "more of a scene than a song, the only scene in the [sung-through] show", and he wanted to reserve the impact of "at least one revelation" that could be experienced more fully onstage.)
- "Non-Stop" – Burr, Hamilton, Angelica, Eliza, Washington, Lafayette, Mulligan, and Company

Act II

- "What'd I Miss?" – Jefferson, Burr, Madison, Washington, Hamilton, and Company
- "Cabinet Battle #1" – Washington, Jefferson, Hamilton, and Madison
- "Take a Break" – Eliza, Philip Hamilton, Hamilton, and Angelica
- "Say No to This" – Maria Reynolds, Burr, Hamilton, James Reynolds, and Company
- "The Room Where It Happens" – Burr, Hamilton, Jefferson, Madison, and Company
- "Schuyler Defeated" – Philip, Eliza, Hamilton, and Burr
- "Cabinet Battle #2" – Washington, Jefferson, Hamilton, and Madison
- "Washington on Your Side" – Burr, Jefferson, Madison, and Company
- "One Last Time" – Washington, Hamilton, and Company (Note: Previously titled "One Last Ride" in the off-Broadway production.)
- "I Know Him" – King George III
- "The Adams Administration" – Burr, Jefferson, Hamilton, Madison, and Company
- "We Know" – Hamilton, Jefferson, Burr, and Madison
- "Hurricane" – Hamilton, Burr, Washington, Eliza, Angelica, Maria, and Company
- "The Reynolds Pamphlet" – Jefferson, Madison, Burr, Hamilton, Angelica, James Reynolds, and Company (Note: "The Reynolds Pamphlet" The song contains a small part of the song "Congratulations" (Off-Broadway).)
- "Burn" – Eliza
- "Blow Us All Away" – Philip, Martha, Dolly, George Eacker, Hamilton, and Company
- "Stay Alive (Reprise)" – Hamilton, Philip, Eliza, Doctor, and Company
- "It's Quiet Uptown" – Angelica, Hamilton, Eliza, and Company
- "The Election of 1800" – Jefferson, Madison, Burr, Hamilton, and Company
- "Your Obedient Servant" – Burr, Hamilton, and Company
- "Best of Wives and Best of Women" – Eliza and Hamilton
- "The World Was Wide Enough" – Burr, Hamilton, Angelica, Philip, and Company
- "Who Lives, Who Dies, Who Tells Your Story" – Eliza, Washington, Angelica, Burr, Jefferson, Madison, Lafayette, Laurens, Mulligan, and Company

=== Recordings ===
==== Original Broadway cast album (2015) ====
The original Broadway cast recording for Hamilton was made available to listeners by NPR on September 21, 2015. It was released by Atlantic Records digitally on September 25, 2015, and physical copies were released on October 16, 2015. The cast album has also been released on vinyl. The album debuted at number 12 on the Billboard 200 albums chart, the highest entrance for a cast recording since 1963. It went on to reach number 2 on the Billboard 200 and number 1 on the Billboard Rap albums chart. The original cast recording won a Grammy Award for Best Musical Theater Album.

==== The Hamilton Mixtape (2016) ====
The Hamilton Mixtape, a collection of remixes, covers, and samples of the musical's songs, was released on December 2, 2016. It debuted at number 1 on the Billboard 200.

==== The Hamilton Instrumentals (2017) and Hamiltunes ====
The Hamilton Instrumentals, an instrumental edition of the original Broadway cast recording without the cast's vocals, was released on June 30, 2017.

In conjunction with the release, the producers of Hamilton announced that they were officially authorizing free sing-along programs for fans, and offering organizers the Hamiltunes name and logo to promote the events. A series of unauthorized Hamilton sing-alongs under that name, starting with Hamiltunes L.A. in early 2016, had already taken place in Los Angeles, San Francisco, and Washington D.C., with spinoff events nationwide.

==== Hamildrops (2017–2018) ====
Miranda announced a new series of 13 Hamilton-related recordings called Hamildrops, releasing once a month from December 2017 to December 2018. The first release, on December 15, 2017, was "Ben Franklin's Song" by The Decemberists, containing lyrics Miranda wrote during the development of Hamilton for an unused song that was never set to music. Miranda had long imagined Benjamin Franklin singing in a "Decemberist-y way", and ultimately sent the lyrics to Colin Meloy, who set them to music.

The second release, on January 25, 2018, was "Wrote My Way Out (Remix)", a remixed version of a song on The Hamilton Mixtape, featuring Royce Da 5'9", Joyner Lucas, Black Thought and Aloe Blacc.

The third release, on March 2, 2018, was "The Hamilton Polka" by "Weird Al" Yankovic, a polka medley of some of the songs from the musical. A fan of Yankovic since childhood, Miranda became friends with him after they tried to develop a musical together. About the origin of the song, Yankovic said, "Lin pitched it to me as a polka medley way more hesitantly than [he] should have. He was like, 'Would you want to do a polka medley?' I was like, 'Of course I do!'" Since Yankovic was busy working on his new tour, he wouldn't be able to release the song in February, so he suggested calling March 2 "February 30th". Miranda said it was "the most perfect 'Weird Al' creative problem solving possible". After Hamilton had premiered on Disney+ in July 2020, Yankovic released a video version of "The Hamilton Polka" that synched his song to video clips from the show.

The fourth release, on March 19, 2018, was "Found/Tonight" by Lin-Manuel Miranda and Ben Platt. A mash-up of the songs "You Will Be Found" from the 2015 stage musical Dear Evan Hansen and "The Story of Tonight", part of the proceeds were destinated to the initiative March for Our Lives, created after the Stoneman Douglas High School shooting. Miranda said the song was his way "of helping to raise funds and awareness for [the efforts of the students in Parkland, Florida], and to say Thank You, and that we are with you so let's keep fighting, together". Platt added that he hoped the song could "play some small part in bringing about real change [in gun control laws]".

The fifth release, on April 30, 2018, was "First Burn", featuring five actresses who played Eliza Hamilton at productions of the musical: Arianna Afsar (original Chicago company), Julia Harriman (first national tour), Shoba Narayan (original second national tour company), Rachelle Ann Go (original West End company) and Lexi Lawson (Broadway). The song is the first draft written by Miranda of "Burn". Miranda described Eliza's portrayal in the first version of the song as "angrier" and "entirely reactive", while in the final version "she has agency", and explained that "it works as a song but not as a scene".

The sixth release, on May 31, 2018, was a cover of "Helpless" by The Regrettes. Miranda credited Mike Elizondo, a producer who worked with the band, as having suggested the idea, which he immediately accepted.

The seventh release, on June 18, 2018, was "Boom Goes the Cannon..." by Mobb Deep. The song, which incorporates a sample of the musical's "Right Hand Man", was one of the last recorded by Havoc and Prodigy, before Prodigy's passing in June 2017. Havoc expressed that the release of the record was "a great way to pay homage to [Prodigy] and continue not only Mobb's legacy, but his as well". Miranda dedicated it to Queensbridge.

The eighth release, "Rise Up, Wise Up, Eyes Up" by French duo Ibeyi, was released on August 31, 2018.

The ninth release, entitled "A Forgotten Spot (Olvidado)", features Puerto Rican singers Zion & Lennox, De La Ghetto, Ivy Queen, PJ Sin Suela and Lucecita Benítez. It was released on September 20, 2018, by Atlantic Records and Warner Music Group. The song was written by Miranda, along with the rest of the collaborators. The song was released on the one-year anniversary of Hurricane Maria which directly struck Puerto Rico in 2017.

The tenth release, a rendition of "Theodosia Reprise" by Sara Bareilles, debuted on the eve of Halloween 2018. It featured show orchestrator Alex Lacamoire on piano and Questlove of The Roots on drums. The song, sharing a moment between Aaron Burr and his daughter, was to appear in Act 2 but was cut from the final production.

The eleventh release was "Cheering For Me Now", an original song with music by John Kander and lyrics by Miranda based on the 1788 Federal Procession in New York City. It was released on November 20, 2018. The release features Miranda performing as Alexander Hamilton and an arrangement by Alex Lacamoire.

On December 20, 2018, the final song was released. "One Last Time (44 Remix)" features the vocals of original Broadway portrayer of George Washington, Christopher Jackson, gospel and R&B singer BeBe Winans, and former U.S. president Barack Obama, reciting the lines from George Washington's farewell address. It is based on "One Last Time" with a revamped gospel type of music. The 44 in the title stands for Obama being the 44th president of the United States.

== Instrumentation ==
The Broadway show's orchestration consists of the following:

- Two keyboards
- Bass (doubling on electric bass, acoustic bass, and synth bass)
- Guitar (doubling on electric, acoustic, and tenor banjo)
- Drums
- Percussion
- Three violins (one doubling on viola)
- Cello

The first keyboard part is played by the conductor.

== Background ==
In 2008, while vacationing in Mexico during his run in In the Heights, Lin-Manuel Miranda read Ron Chernow’s 2004 biography, Alexander Hamilton. After finishing the first few chapters, Miranda began to envision the life of Hamilton as a musical, and researched whether a stage musical of Hamilton's life had been created: all he found was that a play of Hamilton's story had been done on Broadway in 1917, starring George Arliss as Alexander Hamilton.

External audio
- Lin-Manuel Miranda Talks 'Hamilton': Once A 'Ridiculous' Pitch, Now A Revolution, interview with Scott Simon, NPR, April 9, 2016

Miranda began a project titled The Hamilton Mixtape. On May 12, 2009, Miranda was invited to perform music from In the Heights at the White House Evening of Poetry, Music and the Spoken Word. Instead, he performed the first song from The Hamilton Mixtape, an early version of what would later become "Alexander Hamilton", Hamilton's opening number. He spent a year after that working on "My Shot", another early number from the show.

Although Miranda took some dramatic license in recounting the events of Hamilton's life, both the story and the lyrics in the musical numbers were heavily researched. Many of the songs included in the show contain lines lifted directly from primary source documents including personal letters and other documents such as The Federalist Papers and the Reynolds Pamphlet. Miranda has also cited the television series The West Wing as an inspiration for his approach to the musical.

Miranda performed in a workshop production of the show, then titled The Hamilton Mixtape, at the Vassar College and New York Stage and Film Powerhouse Theater on July 27, 2013. The workshop production was directed by Thomas Kail and musically directed by Alex Lacamoire. The workshop consisted of the entirety of the first act of the show and three songs from the second act. The workshop was accompanied by Lacamoire on the piano. The cast included Miranda as Hamilton, Utkarsh Ambudkar as Burr, Christopher Jackson as Washington, Daveed Diggs as Lafayette/Jefferson, Ana Nogueira as Eliza, Anika Noni Rose as Angelica, Javier Muñoz as Laurens, Presilah Nunez as Peggy/Maria, and Joshua Henry as Mulligan/Madison/King George.

Of the Vassar workshop cast, only three principal cast members played in the off-Broadway production: Miranda, Diggs, and Jackson. Ambudkar, who played Aaron Burr at Vassar later stated that while the part was written with him in mind, his alcoholism at the time led to him being replaced. The original off-Broadway cast moved to Broadway, except for Brian d'Arcy James, who was replaced by Jonathan Groff as King George III.

In 2014, there was a workshop production at the 52nd Street Project starring Miranda as Hamilton, Leslie Odom Jr. as Burr, Diggs as Lafayette/Jefferson, Phillipa Soo as Eliza, Renée Elise Goldsberry as Angelica, Anthony Ramos as Laurens/Philip, Okieriete Onaodowan as Mulligan/Madison, Ciara Renée as Peggy/Maria, James as King George III, and Isaiah Johnson as Washington. An audio recording of this production is available on YouTube.

== Productions ==
An Off-Broadway promotional poster for the musical

=== Off-Broadway (2015) ===
External videos
- Interview with Ron Chernow (conducted by Harold Holzer) on the adaptation of his book into the play, February 25, 2016, C-SPAN
- Q&A interview with Chernow on Alexander Hamilton and Hamilton: The Musical, April 24, 2016, C-SPAN

Directed by Thomas Kail and choreographed by Andy Blankenbuehler, the musical received its world premiere Off-Broadway at The Public Theater, under the supervision of the Public's Artistic Director Oskar Eustis, with previews starting on January 20, 2015, and officially opening on February 17. The production was extended twice, first to April 5 and then to May 3. Chernow served as historical consultant to the production. The show opened to universal acclaim according to review aggregator Did He Like It.

According to New York Post gossip columnist Michael Riedel, producer Jeffrey Seller wanted to take the show to Broadway before the end of the 2014–2015 season in order to capitalize on public interest in the show and qualify for eligibility for that year's Tony Awards (Seller had made a similar decision as a producer of the musical Rent, which opened off-Broadway in January 1996, and quickly moved to Broadway in April); however, he was overruled by Miranda and Kail, as Miranda wanted more time to work on the show. Changes made between off-Broadway and Broadway included the cutting of several numbers, a rewrite of Hamilton's final moments before his death, and a cutting-down of the song "One Last Ride" (now titled "One Last Time") to focus simply on Washington's decision not to run for a third term as president.

=== Broadway (2015–present) ===
Hamilton premiered on Broadway at the Richard Rodgers Theatre (also home to Miranda's 2008 Broadway debut In the Heights) on July 13, 2015, in previews, and opened on August 6, 2015. As in the off-Broadway production, the show is produced by Seller, Jill Furman and Sandy Jacobs with sets by David Korins, costumes by Paul Tazewell, lighting by Howell Binkley and sound by Nevin Steinberg.

The production was critically acclaimed and won 11 Tony Awards.

In April 2016, the cast reached an agreement with the show's producers for a profit-sharing deal, an uncommon arrangement in theater.

On March 12, 2020, the show suspended production due to the COVID-19 pandemic. Performances resumed on September 14, 2021.

=== Chicago (2016–2020) ===
Hamilton began previews at the CIBC Theatre in Chicago on September 27, 2016. The Chicago production cast included Miguel Cervantes as Alexander Hamilton, Joshua Henry as Aaron Burr, Karen Olivo as Angelica Schuyler, Arianna Afsar as Eliza Schuyler, Alexander Gemignani as King George III, Jonathan Kirkland as George Washington, and Samantha Marie Ware as Peggy/Maria Reynolds. On its opening in October, attended by author Miranda, the Chicago production received strongly positive reviews. The Chicago run closed on January 5, 2020, after 1,341 shows. The production grossed $400 million, breaking the box office record for theater in Chicago. According to Chris Jones, the success was made possible by the larger number of seats the CIBC Theatre holds and can sell compared with, for example, the show's smaller New York City venue. Overall, "more than 2.6 million people took in Hamilton during its Chicago run", including the "31 thousand public school students who saw it through the Hamilton Education Program".

=== North American touring productions (2017–present) ===
==== Angelica Tour (2017–2023, 2024–present) and Phillip Tour (2018–2025) ====
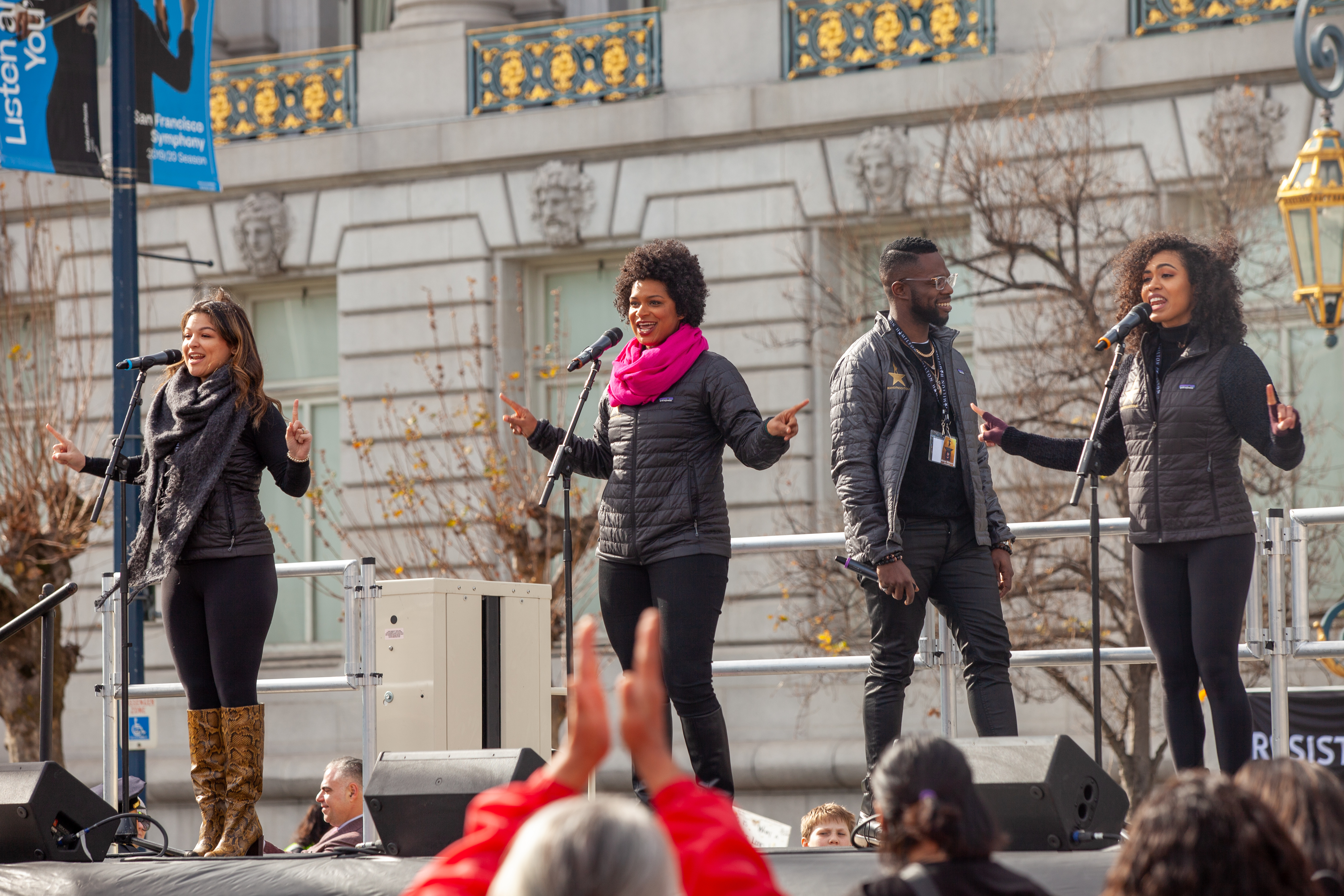
Members of the touring cast perform at the 2020 Women's March in San Francisco

Plans for a national tour of Hamilton emerged near the end of January 2016. The tour was initially announced with over 20 stops, scheduled from 2017 through at least 2020. Tickets to the tour's run in San Francisco—its debut city—sold out within 24 hours of release; the number of people who entered the online waiting room to purchase tickets surpassed 110,000. The first national touring production began preview performances at San Francisco's SHN Orpheum Theatre on March 10, 2017, and officially opened on March 23. The production ran in San Francisco until August 5, when it transferred to Los Angeles's Hollywood Pantages Theatre for a run from August 11 to December 30, 2017.

Just days after the first U.S. tour began performances in San Francisco, news emerged that a second U.S. tour of Hamilton would begin in Seattle for a six-week limited engagement before touring North America concurrently with the first tour. To distinguish the first and second touring productions, the production team has labeled them, respectively, the "Angelica Tour" and the "Philip Tour".

The Philip tour began preview performances at the Paramount Theatre in Seattle on February 6, 2018, before officially opening on February 15, 2018.

The Angelica tour alone required 14 truckloads of cargo and a core group of over 60 traveling cast, crew, and musicians. The production team insisted that each tour must be able to duplicate the original Broadway show's choreography, which utilizes two concentric turntables on the stage. This led to the construction of four portable sets, two for each tour, so that one set can be assembled well in advance at the next stop while the tour was still playing at the last stop.

Hamilton premiered in Canada when the Philip tour began a planned three-month run at the Ed Mirvish Theatre in Toronto, Ontario on February 11, 2020. The show was slated to run until May 17, 2020, but instead abruptly ended on March 14 due to the COVID-19 pandemic.

The Angelica tour concluded its run on June 25, 2023, at the Centro de Bellas Artes Luis A. Ferré in Puerto Rico.

The Angelica tour re-opened on September 4, 2024, at the Hollywood Pantages Theatre and ran along with the Phillip tour again after a resurgence of popularity for Hamilton.

==== And Peggy Tour (2019–2023) ====
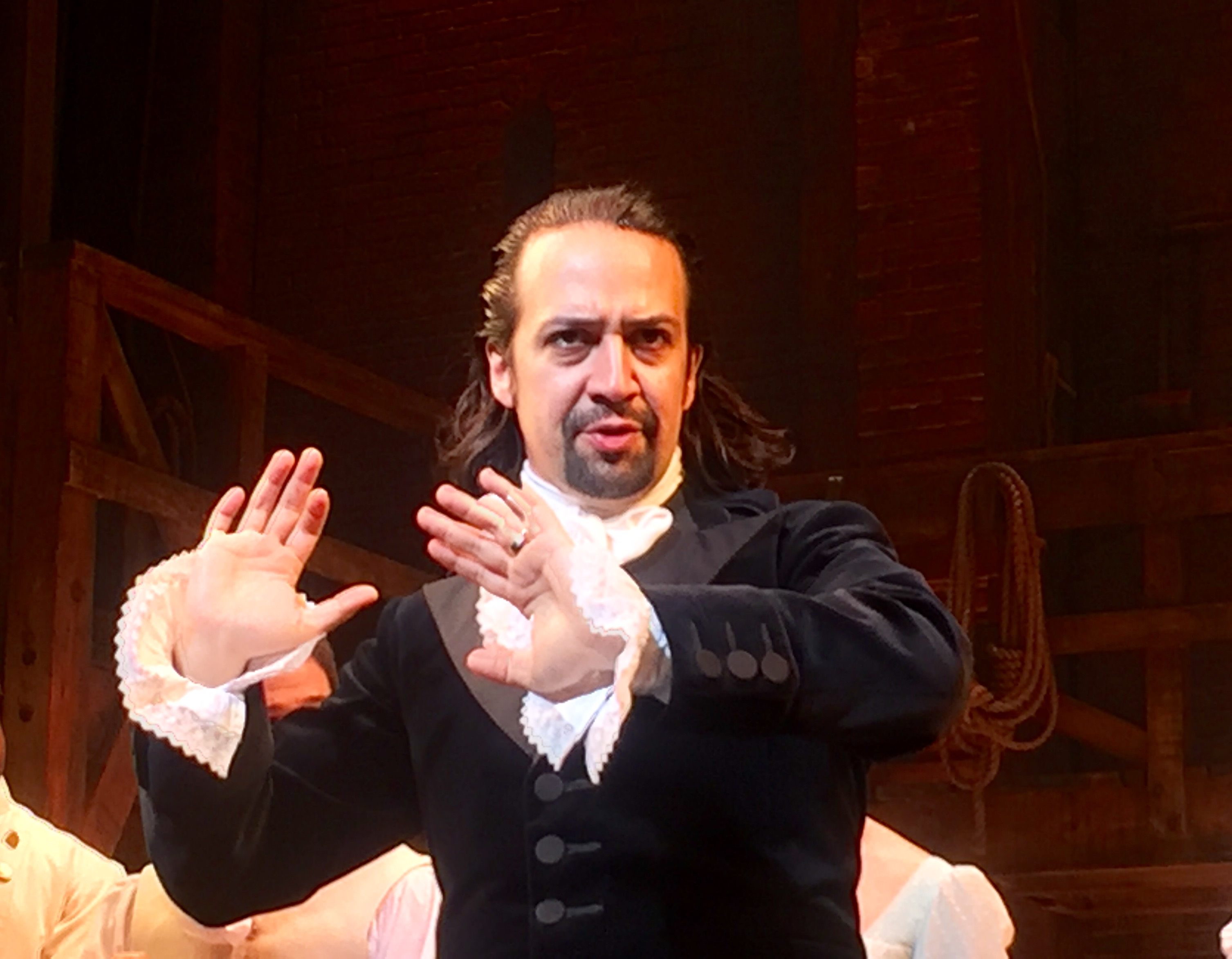
Lin-Manuel Miranda as Alexander Hamilton during the second act

Producers announced the formation of a third touring company on November 8, 2017, dubbed the "And Peggy Tour". It was to debut in a January 8–27, 2019 run at the University of Puerto Rico's Teatro UPR in San Juan, with Lin-Manuel Miranda reprising the title role, then to become a San Francisco production with a different lead. The Teatro UPR stage, damaged by 2017's Hurricane Maria, was repaired in a months-long restoration in anticipation of the show.

On December 21, 2018, less than a month away from opening night, negotiations between the show's production and the local faculty and staff union shifted the three-week engagement to the Luis A. Ferré Performing Arts Center, and shortening it by three days to January 11–27. This followed weeks of warnings from the union of possible protests outside the theater over budget cuts that the University of Puerto Rico administration was considering that would affect university staff and employees. In response to the prospect of union and pro-statehood protestors, a line of police stood outside the theater on opening night.

Miranda's performance in the Luis A. Ferré Performing Arts Center marked his return to the venue nine years after he reprised the role of Usnavi for the San Juan stop of the North American touring production of In the Heights. The Tonight Show Starring Jimmy Fallon taped segments in Puerto Rico to help tourism, one of them with the "And Peggy Tour" cast performing a version of "The Story of Tonight", where Jimmy Fallon joined in as a second Alexander Hamilton next to Miranda, changing the final song lyric to "they'll tell the story of Tonight Show", and ending the performance with a salsa version of Fallon's Tonight Show opening song.

In a review of the Puerto Rico production, Chris Jones said Miranda's performance demonstrated "deeper on-stage emotions", as well as improved vocal and dance technique than on his original run on Broadway. Jones praised Miranda's "signature warmth" as well as Donald Webber Jr., calling Webber's performance as Aaron Burr "exceptional". The sold-out three-week engagement raised about $15 million for Miranda's Flamboyán Arts Fund, which benefits arts in Puerto Rico; the first beneficiary having been the restoration of the Teatro UPR, where the three-week engagement would have originally taken place.

A filmed version of "Alexander Hamilton" was created featuring the Puerto Rico production and was shown as the final part of Hamilton: The Exhibition in 2019.

Julius Thomas III took over the role of Alexander Hamilton when the And Peggy tour moved to San Francisco, where it opened on February 21, 2019. Despite billing as a tour (as is the common theatrical convention with West Coast sit-down productions), the And Peggy Tour was fixed in San Francisco for a lengthy residency with no scheduled traveling dates. The San Francisco production was given a separate tab on the show's website from the two traveling North American tours. The production stopped performances on March 11, 2020, due to the COVID-19 pandemic. The San Francisco production reopened on August 10, 2021, and closed on September 5, 2021, to resume touring. The And Peggy Company had their final performance at the Princess of Wales Theatre in Toronto on August 20, 2023.

==== Eliza Tour (2021–2022) ====
A new production in Los Angeles was to run from March 12 to November 22, 2020, at the Hollywood Pantages Theatre, but was suspended on the date of its intended debut in response to the COVID-19 pandemic.

The production finally opened on August 27, 2021, and ran until March 20, 2022. It was named the Eliza Tour by the production team.

=== West End (2017–present) ===
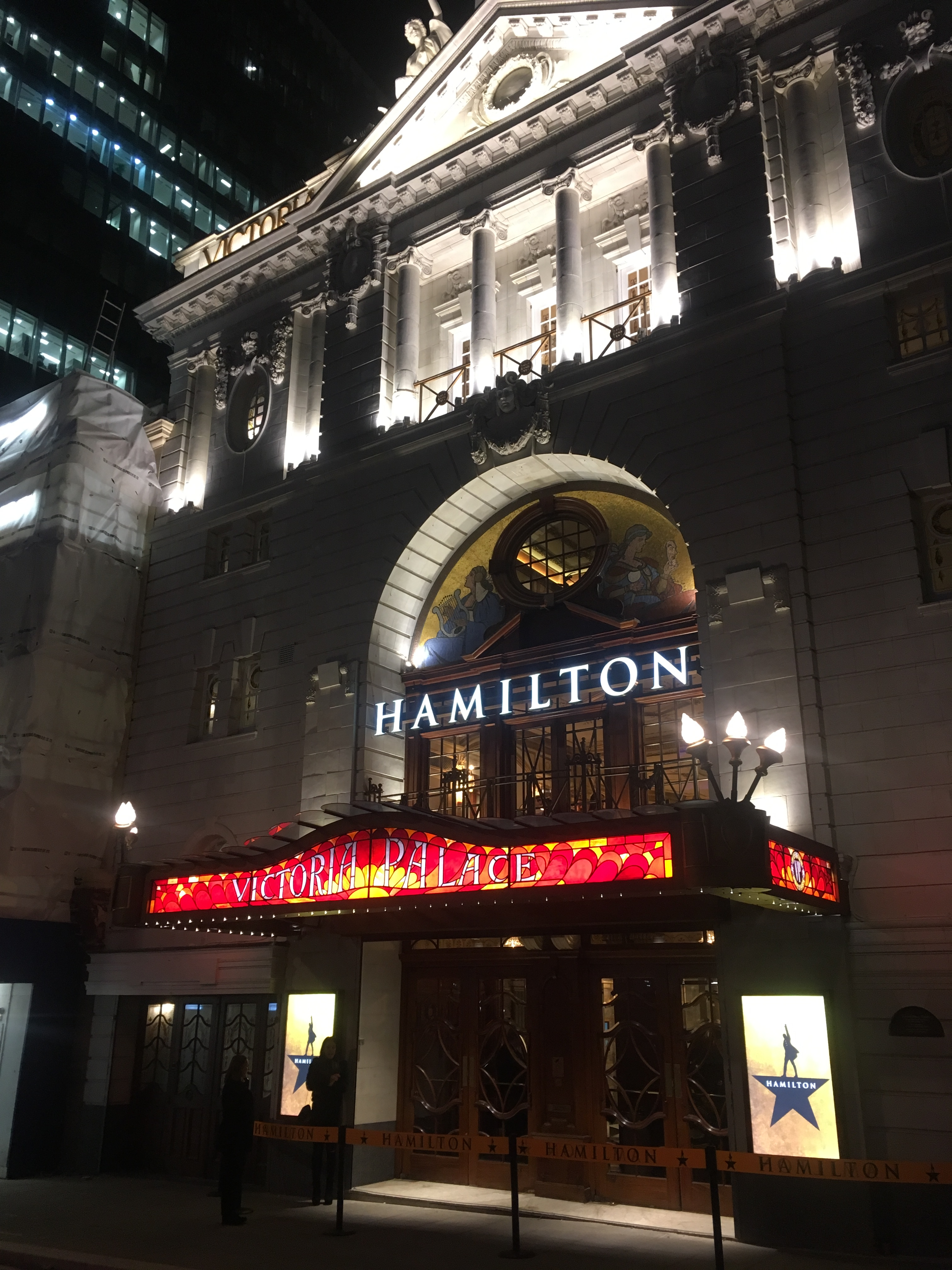
Hamilton at the Victoria Palace Theatre in London in December 2017

Cameron Mackintosh produced a London production that re-opened the Victoria Palace Theatre on December 21, 2017, following previews from December 6. Initial principal casting was announced on January 26, 2017. The London production received strongly positive reviews.

In 2018, Prince Harry attended a charity performance of the London production, where he sung a few bars of "You'll Be Back," sung in the show by his sixth great-grandfather King George III.

The show was forced to close from March 16, 2020, due to the COVID-19 pandemic in England. It was announced in June 2020 that it would not reopen until 2021. It reopened on August 19, 2021.

=== Australia (2021–2023) ===
Hamilton had its Australian premiere at Sydney Lyric, with previews beginning March 17, 2021. The Australian company was led by Jason Arrow as Alexander Hamilton, Chloé Zuel as Eliza Hamilton, Lyndon Watts as Aaron Burr, Akina Edmonds as Angelica Schuyler, Matu Ngaropo as George Washington, Victory Ndukwe as Marquis de Lafayette/Thomas Jefferson, Shaka Cook as Hercules Mulligan/James Madison, Marty Alix as John Laurens/Philip Hamilton, Elandrah Eramiha as Peggy Schuyler/Maria Reynolds and Brent Hill as King George III. The production was forced to suspend performances due to Sydney's Second Wave of the COVID-19 pandemic on June 25, 2021. Performances resumed on October 19, following a significant uptake in COVID-19 vaccines.

The production opened in Melbourne at Her Majesty's Theatre on March 15, 2022, one year following the opening in Sydney. The company performed a Ham4Ham show on March 22, 2022, before the official opening night on the 24th. A mashup of iconic Australian songs mixed with the Hamilton soundtrack was performed by the cast and written by Alex Lacamoire. The Melbourne production received overwhelming positive reviews, with Jason Arrow's performance praised, with The Age saying that Arrow "wipes the floor with Miranda's performance in the Disney+ version". Standby Tigist Strode performed the role of Eliza on opening night and was also received positively by reviewers. In September 2022, Sami Afuni took over the role of Hercules Mulligan/James Madison whilst Rowan Witt joined the company for the remainder of the Melbourne Season as King George. The Melbourne season ended on January 15, following a nine-month run.

The Australian tour continued in 2023, playing at the Lyric Theatre, QPAC in Brisbane from January, where it concluded its run on April 23.

=== Hamburg (2022–2023) ===
According to a report in Forbes, Stage Entertainment announced a German production in 2019 to open at the Operettenhaus in Hamburg. Originally scheduled for November 2021, the opening was postponed due to the COVID-19 pandemic. Previews started on September 24, 2022, and the opening night eventually took place on October 6, 2022. It was the first official non-English production of the show.

The translation of the lyrics was done by German musical author Kevin Schroeder and German rapper Sera Finale.

In March 2023 it was announced that the production would end in October 2023 after only one year due to disappointing ticket sales. The production then closed on October 15, 2023.

=== International Tour (2023–2024) ===
The Australian producers, Michael Cassel Group, announced an international tour to commence in Auckland, New Zealand at Spark Arena in May 2023. The production features the Australian cast, and is the first to be staged in an arena.

On March 28, 2023, through the GMG Productions social media pages, Miranda announced that the musical would have its Asian premiere in Manila, Philippines, in September at the Solaire Resort & Casino's theatre. The tour started previews in Manila on September 21, 2023, before having an opening night on November 11, 2023. Several Australian cast members, including Jason Arrow as Alexander Hamilton, returned for the first Asian production, The Manila run of the production performed there until November 26, 2023. Filipino actress Rachelle Ann Go reprised her role as Eliza from the original West End production. After the Manila run, the production moved to Abu Dhabi in 2024, where it ran from January 17 to February 11 at the Etihad Arena. Subsequently, the show was transferred to Singapore starting on April 19 at the Sands Theatre, Marina Bay Sands.

=== UK and Ireland Tour (2023–2025) ===
A UK and Ireland tour began at the Palace Theatre, Manchester on November 11, 2023, before touring to Edinburgh, Bristol, Birmingham, Dublin, Cardiff, Bradford, Southampton, Liverpool, Sunderland, Plymouth and Norwich. The full cast was announced on 21 September, with Shaq Taylor taking on the titular role. It closed on 27 December at the Theatre Royal, Glasgow.

== Box office and business ==
=== Opening and box office records ===
Hamilton's off-Broadway engagement at The Public Theater was sold out, and when the musical opened on Broadway, it had a multimillion-dollar advance in ticket sales, reportedly taking in $30 million before its official opening.

By September 2015, the show was sold out for most of its Broadway engagement. It was the second-highest-grossing show on Broadway for the Labor Day week ending September 6, 2015 (behind only The Lion King).

Hamilton set a Broadway box office record for the most money grossed in a single week in New York City in late November 2016, when it grossed $3.3 million for an eight-performance week, the first show to break $3 million in eight performances.

=== Ticket lottery and Ham4Ham ===
Hamilton, like some other Broadway musicals, offers a ticket lottery before every show. Initially, 21 front-row seats (and occasional standing room tickets) were offered in each lottery. Hamilton creator Lin-Manuel Miranda began preparing and hosting outdoor mini-performances shortly before each daily drawing, allowing lottery participants to experience a part of the show even when they did not win tickets. These were dubbed the "Ham4Ham" shows, because lottery winners were given the opportunity to purchase two tickets at the reduced price of one Hamilton ($10 bill) each.

The online theatrical journal HowlRound characterized Ham4Ham as an expression of Miranda's cultural background:

Ham4Ham follows a long tradition of Latina/o (or the ancestors of present-day Latina/os) theatremaking that dates back to when the events in Hamilton were happening. ... The philosophy behind this is simple. If the people won't come to the theatre, then take the theatre to the people. While El Teatro Campesino's 'taking it to the streets' originated from a place of social protest, Ham4Ham does so to create accessibility, tap into social media, and ultimately generate a free, self-functioning marketing campaign. In this way, Ham4Ham falls into a lineage of accessibility as a Latina/o theatremaking aesthetic.

As a result of the Ham4Ham shows, Hamilton's lottery drew unusually large crowds of people who created congestion on West 46th Street. To avoid increasingly dangerous crowding and traffic conditions, an online ticket lottery began operating in early January 2016. On the first day of the online lottery, more than 50,000 people entered, crashing the website.

After Miranda left the show on July 9, 2016, Rory O'Malley, then playing King George III, took over as the host of Ham4Ham. The Ham4Ham show officially ended on August 31, 2016, after more than a year of performances. The online lottery continued, with an official mobile app released in August 2017 that expanded the lottery by offering tickets for touring productions of Hamilton as well as the Broadway show.

== Critical response ==
Michelle Obama welcomes the Broadway cast of Hamilton and students to a workshop held in the State Dining Room, March 14, 2016.

Marilyn Stasio, in her review of the off-Broadway production of the show for Variety, wrote, "The music is exhilarating, but the lyrics are a big surprise. The sense, as well as the sound of the sung dialogue, has been purposely suited to each character. George Washington, a stately figure in Jackson's dignified performance, sings in polished prose. ... In the end, Miranda's impassioned narrative of one man's story becomes the collective narrative of a nation, a nation built by immigrants who occasionally need to be reminded where they came from."

In his review of the off-Broadway production, Jesse Green in New York wrote, "The conflict between independence and interdependence is not just the show's subject but also its method: It brings the complexity of forming a union from disparate constituencies right to your ears. ... Few are the theatergoers who will be familiar with all of Miranda's touchstones. I caught the verbal references to Rodgers and Hammerstein, Gilbert and Sullivan, [Stephen] Sondheim, West Side Story, and 1776, but other people had to point out to me the frequent hat-tips to hip-hop ... Whether it's a watershed, a breakthrough, and a game-changer, as some have been saying, is another matter. Miranda is too savvy (and loves his antecedents too much) to try to reinvent all the rules at once. ... Those duels, by the way—there are three of them—are superbly handled, the highlights of a riveting if at times overbusy staging by the director Thomas Kail and the choreographer Andy Blankenbuehler."

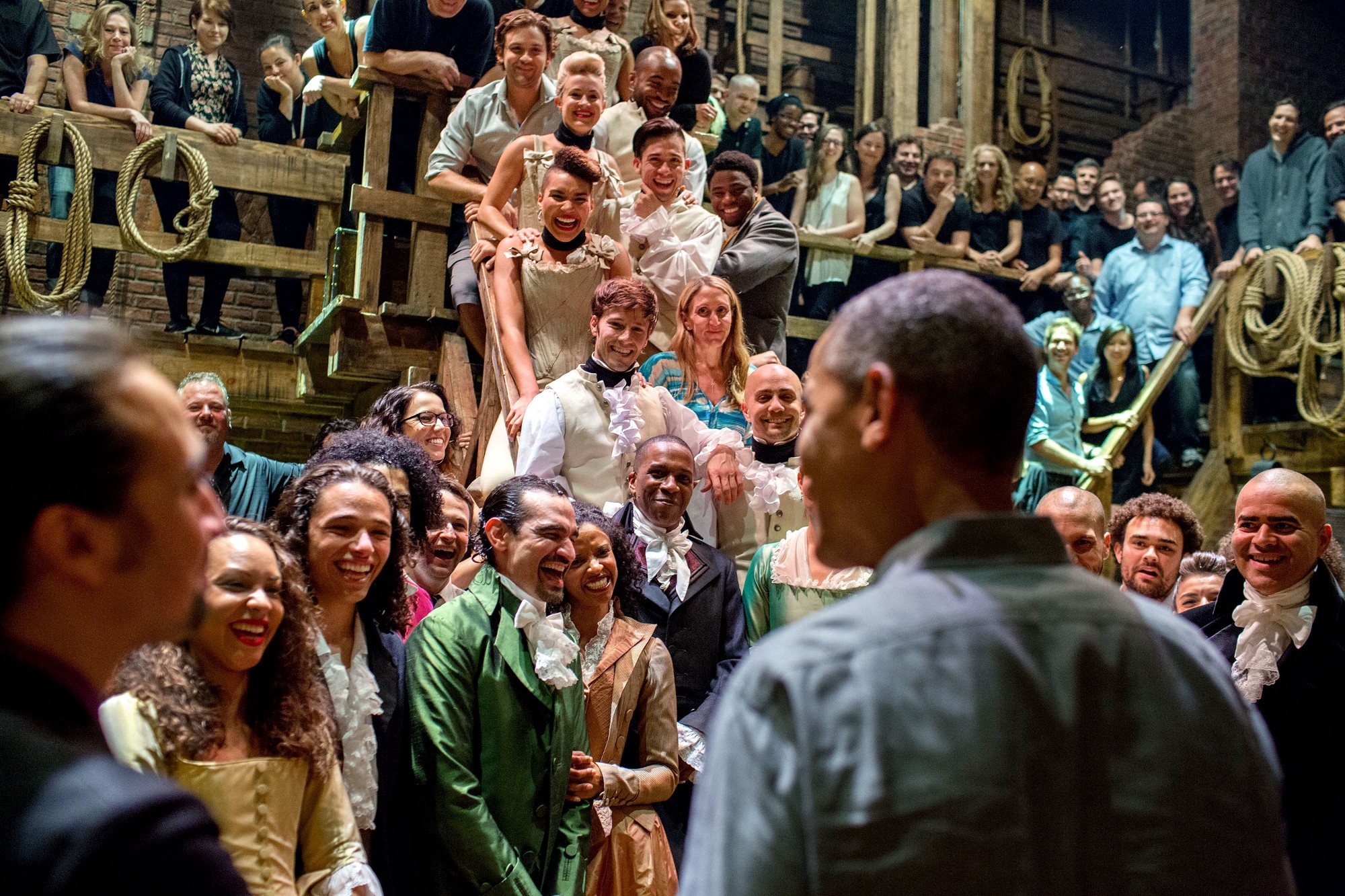
The Hamilton cast and crew greeted President Barack Obama on July 18, 2015. This performance was led by Miranda's then-alternate, Javier Muñoz (center left), in the titular role, while Miranda (far left) accompanied Obama in the audience.

Although giving a positive review, Elisabeth Vincentelli, of the New York Post (which was founded by Hamilton himself), wrote that Hamilton and Burr's love/hate relationship "fails to drive the show—partly because Miranda lacks the charisma and intensity of the man he portrays", and that "too many of the numbers are exposition-heavy lessons, as if this were 'Schoolhouse Rap!' The show is burdened with eye-glazingly dull stretches, especially those involving George Washington."

Reviewing the Broadway production in The New York Times, Ben Brantley wrote, "But Hamilton, directed by Thomas Kail and starring Mr. Miranda, might just about be worth it...Washington, Jefferson, Madison—they're all here, making war and writing constitutions and debating points of economic structure. So are Aaron Burr and the Marquis de Lafayette. They wear the clothes (by Paul Tazewell) you might expect them to wear in a traditional costume drama, and the big stage they inhabit has been done up (by David Korins) to suggest a period-appropriate tavern, where incendiary youth might gather to drink, brawl and plot revolution." Melanie McFarland of Salon.com wrote, "Enthralling [and] uplifting".

In Time Out New York, David Cote wrote, "I love Hamilton... A sublime conjunction of radio-ready hip-hop (as well as R&B, Britpop and trad showstoppers), under-dramatized American history and Miranda's uniquely personal focus as a first-generation Puerto Rican and inexhaustible wordsmith, Hamilton hits multilevel culture buttons, hard. ... The work's human drama and novelistic density remain astonishing." Cote chose Hamilton as a Critics' Pick, and gave the production five out of five stars.

In an issue of Journal of the Early Republic, Andrew Schocket wrote that while Hamilton makes bold choices to stray away from what he calls the "American Revolution Rebooted" genre, it remains "forged in the mold of this genre, and despite its casting and hip-hop delivery, is more representative of it than we might think". In the same issue, Marvin McAllister noted that the production's heavy hip-hop influence works so well because "Miranda elevates the form through this marriage with musical theater storytelling, and in the process, ennobles the culture and the creators."

A review in The Economist summed up the response to Hamilton as "near-universal critical acclaim". Barack Obama joked in 2016 that admiration for the musical is "the only thing Dick Cheney and I agree on". In 2019, writers for The Guardian ranked Hamilton the second-greatest theatrical work since 2000.

Some feminist scholars have criticized Hamilton for its depiction of women. Theatre professor Stacy Wolf finds that female characters are assigned "limited and stereotypical roles" within a male-dominated story dominated by masculine perspectives and aesthetics. Musicologist Cheryl L. Keyes argues that the main character's three love interests — Eliza Hamilton, Angelica Schuyler, and Maria Reynolds — conform to a trifecta of female character tropes defined by the male gaze and found in hip hop music: the "good wife", the "gold digger", and the "whore".

== Honors and awards ==
=== Original off-Broadway productions ===
Year	Award	Category	Nominee	Result
2015	Lucille Lortel Awards	Outstanding Musical		Won
2015	Lucille Lortel Awards	Outstanding Director	Thomas Kail	Won
2015	Lucille Lortel Awards	Outstanding Choreographer	Andy Blankenbuehler	Won
2015	Lucille Lortel Awards	Outstanding Lead Actor in a Musical	Lin-Manuel Miranda	Won
2015	Lucille Lortel Awards	Outstanding Lead Actor in a Musical	Leslie Odom Jr.	Nominated
2015	Lucille Lortel Awards	Outstanding Lead Actress in a Musical	Phillipa Soo	Won
2015	Lucille Lortel Awards	Outstanding Featured Actor in a Musical	Daveed Diggs	Won
2015	Lucille Lortel Awards	Outstanding Featured Actor in a Musical	Brian d'Arcy James	Nominated
2015	Lucille Lortel Awards	Outstanding Featured Actress in a Musical	Renée Elise Goldsberry	Won
2015	Lucille Lortel Awards	Outstanding Costume Design	Paul Tazewell	Won
2015	Lucille Lortel Awards	Outstanding Lighting Design	Howell Binkley	Won
2015	Lucille Lortel Awards	Outstanding Sound Design	Nevin Steinberg	Won
2015	Outer Critics Circle Awards	Outstanding New Off-Broadway Musical		Won
2015	Outer Critics Circle Awards	Outstanding Book of a Musical	Lin-Manuel Miranda	Won
2015	Outer Critics Circle Awards	Outstanding New Score	Lin-Manuel Miranda	Won
2015	Outer Critics Circle Awards	Outstanding Director of a Musical	Thomas Kail	Nominated
2015	Outer Critics Circle Awards	Outstanding Choreography	Andy Blankenbuehler	Nominated
2015	Drama League Awards	Outstanding Production of a Broadway or Off-Broadway Musical		Nominated
2015	Drama League Awards	Distinguished Performance	Daveed Diggs	Nominated
2015	Drama League Awards	Distinguished Performance	Lin-Manuel Miranda	Nominated
2015	Drama Desk Awards	Outstanding Musical		Won
2015	Drama Desk Awards	Outstanding Actor in a Musical	Lin-Manuel Miranda	Nominated
2015	Drama Desk Awards	Outstanding Featured Actor in a Musical	Leslie Odom Jr.	Nominated
2015	Drama Desk Awards	Outstanding Featured Actress in a Musical	Renée Elise Goldsberry	Won
2015	Drama Desk Awards	Outstanding Director of a Musical	Thomas Kail	Won
2015	Drama Desk Awards	Outstanding Music	Lin-Manuel Miranda	Won
2015	Drama Desk Awards	Outstanding Lyrics	Lin-Manuel Miranda	Won
2015	Drama Desk Awards	Outstanding Book of a Musical	Lin-Manuel Miranda	Won
2015	Drama Desk Awards	Outstanding Orchestrations	Alex Lacamoire	Nominated
2015	Drama Desk Awards	Outstanding Set Design	David Korins	Nominated
2015	Drama Desk Awards	Outstanding Costume Design	Paul Tazewell	Nominated
2015	Drama Desk Awards	Outstanding Lighting Design	Howell Binkley	Nominated
2015	Drama Desk Awards	Outstanding Sound Design in a Musical	Nevin Steinberg	Won
2015	Drama Desk Awards	Special Award ‡	Andy Blankenbuehler	Won
2015	New York Drama Critics' Circle Awards	Best Musical	Lin-Manuel Miranda	Won
2015	Off Broadway Alliance Awards	Best New Musical		Won
2015	Theatre World Awards	Outstanding Debut Performance	Daveed Diggs	Won
2015	Clarence Derwent Awards	Most Promising Female Performer	Phillipa Soo	Won
2015	Obie Awards	Best New American Theatre Work	Lin-Manuel Miranda, Thomas Kail, Andy Blankenbuehler, Alex Lacamoire	Won
2015	Edgerton Foundation New American Play Awards			Won

‡ Blankenbuehler received a Special Drama Desk Award for "his inspired and heart-stopping choreography in Hamilton, which is indispensable [sic] to the musical's storytelling. His body of work is versatile, yet a dynamic and fluid style is consistently evident. When it's time to 'take his shot,' Blankenbuehler hits the bulls-eye."

=== Original Broadway production ===
The musical currently holds the record for most Tony Award nominations with 16 nominations (though due to multiple nominations in the two 'actor' categories, it could have only won 13 awards unless a tie occurred). It eventually won 11 awards, the second-most ever given to a single production, behind only the original Broadway production of The Producers (2001), which won twelve.

Year	Award	Category	Nominee	Result
2016	Tony Awards	Best Musical		Won
2016	Tony Awards	Best Book of a Musical	Lin-Manuel Miranda	Won
2016	Tony Awards	Best Original Score	Lin-Manuel Miranda	Won
2016	Tony Awards	Best Direction of a Musical	Thomas Kail	Won
2016	Tony Awards	Best Actor in a Musical	Lin-Manuel Miranda	Nominated
2016	Tony Awards	Best Actor in a Musical	Leslie Odom Jr.	Won
2016	Tony Awards	Best Actress in a Musical	Phillipa Soo	Nominated
2016	Tony Awards	Best Featured Actor in a Musical	Daveed Diggs	Won
2016	Tony Awards	Best Featured Actor in a Musical	Jonathan Groff	Nominated
2016	Tony Awards	Best Featured Actor in a Musical	Christopher Jackson	Nominated
2016	Tony Awards	Best Featured Actress in a Musical	Renée Elise Goldsberry	Won
2016	Tony Awards	Best Scenic Design of a Musical	David Korins	Nominated
2016	Tony Awards	Best Costume Design of a Musical	Paul Tazewell	Won
2016	Tony Awards	Best Lighting Design of a Musical	Howell Binkley	Won
2016	Tony Awards	Best Choreography	Andy Blankenbuehler	Won
2016	Tony Awards	Best Orchestrations	Alex Lacamoire	Won
2016	Drama League Awards	Outstanding Production of a Broadway or Off-Broadway Musical		Won
2016	Drama League Awards	Distinguished Performance	Daveed Diggs	Nominated
2016	Drama League Awards	Distinguished Performance	Lin-Manuel Miranda	Won
2016	Pulitzer Prize	Drama	Lin-Manuel Miranda	Won
2016	Grammy Awards	Best Musical Theater Album	Daveed Diggs, Renée Elise Goldsberry, Jonathan Groff, Christopher Jackson, Jasmine Cephas Jones, Lin-Manuel Miranda, Leslie Odom Jr., Okieriete Onaodowan, Anthony Ramos & Phillipa Soo (principal soloists); Alex Lacamoire, Lin-Manuel Miranda, Bill Sherman, Ahmir Thompson & Tariq Trotter (producers); Lin-Manuel Miranda (composer & lyricist)	Won
2016	Fred and Adele Astaire Awards	Outstanding Ensemble in a Broadway Show		Nominated
2016	Fred and Adele Astaire Awards	Best Choreographer	Andy Blankenbuehler	Won
2016	Fred and Adele Astaire Awards	Best Male Dancer	Daveed Diggs	Nominated
2016	NAACP Image Awards	Outstanding Duo, Group or Collaboration	Original Broadway Cast	Nominated
2016	Dramatists Guild of America Awards	Frederick Loewe Award for Dramatic Composition	Lin-Manuel Miranda	Won
2016	Edward M. Kennedy Prize	Drama Inspired by American History	Lin-Manuel Miranda	Won
2017	Billboard Music Award	Top Soundtrack/Cast Album		Won
2018	Kennedy Center Honors	Lin-Manuel Miranda, Andy Blankenbuehler, Alex Lacamoire and Thomas Kail		Won

=== Original West End production ===
Year	Award	Category	Nominee	Result
2017	Critics' Circle Theatre Award	Best Musical		Won
2018	Laurence Olivier Awards	Best New Musical		Won
2018	Laurence Olivier Awards	Outstanding Achievement in Music	Alex Lacamoire and Lin-Manuel Miranda	Won
2018	Laurence Olivier Awards	Best Actor in a Musical	Giles Terera	Won
2018	Laurence Olivier Awards	Best Actor in a Musical	Jamael Westman	Nominated
2018	Laurence Olivier Awards	Best Actor in a Supporting Role in a Musical	Michael Jibson	Won
2018	Laurence Olivier Awards	Best Actor in a Supporting Role in a Musical	Jason Pennycooke	Nominated
2018	Laurence Olivier Awards	Best Actor in a Supporting Role in a Musical	Cleve September	Nominated
2018	Laurence Olivier Awards	Best Actress in a Supporting Role in a Musical	Rachel John	Nominated
2018	Laurence Olivier Awards	Best Costume Design	Paul Tazewell	Nominated
2018	Laurence Olivier Awards	Best Lighting Design	Howell Binkley	Won
2018	Laurence Olivier Awards	Best Sound Design	Nevin Steinberg	Won
2018	Laurence Olivier Awards	Best Director	Thomas Kail	Nominated
2018	Laurence Olivier Awards	Best Theatre Choreographer	Andy Blankenbuehler	Won

=== Original Australian production ===
Year	Award	Category	Nominee	Result
2021	BroadwayWorld Australia – Sydney	Best Musical (Professional)		Won
2021	BroadwayWorld Australia – Sydney	Best Direction of a Musical (Professional)	Thomas Kail	Won
2021	BroadwayWorld Australia – Sydney	Best Choreography of a Play of Musical (Professional)	Andy Blankenbuhler	Won
2021	BroadwayWorld Australia – Sydney	Best Supporting Performer in a Musical (Professional)	Shaka Cook	Won
2022	Sydney Theatre Awards	Best Production of a Musical		Won
2022	Sydney Theatre Awards	Best Performance In A Leading Role In A Musical	Jason Arrow	Nominated
2022	Sydney Theatre Awards	Best Performance In A Leading Role In A Musical	Lyndon Watts	Won
2022	Sydney Theatre Awards	Best Performance In A Supporting Role In A Musical	Akina Edmonds	Nominated
2022	Sydney Theatre Awards	Best Performance In A Supporting Role In A Musical	Marty Alix	Won

=== Accolades ===
External videos
- Presentation to Lin-Manuel Miranda of the Special Achievement Award from the board of the George Washington Book Prize, December 14, 2015, C-SPAN

Publication	Accolade	Rank
Billboard	25 Best Albums of 2015	2
Rolling Stone	50 Best Albums of 2015	8

== Concept ==
The names of many main characters, including that of Elizabeth Schuyler Hamilton, are given a unique melodic motif that is repeated throughout the musical Hamilton in various keys, tempos, and timbres depending on the context, an example of how Hamilton weaves melodic and lyrical reprises into later songs in the score in order to cue an emotional response.

According to The New Yorker, the show is "an achievement of historical and cultural reimagining". The costumes and set reflect the period, with "velvet frock coats and knee britches. The set ... is a wooden scaffold against exposed brick; the warm lighting suggests candlelight". The musical is mostly sung and rapped all the way through, with little dialogue isolated outside of the musical score.

=== Casting diversity ===
Miranda said that the portrayal of Hamilton, Thomas Jefferson, George Washington, and other white historical figures by black, Latino and Asian actors should not require any substantial suspension of disbelief by audience members. "Our cast looks like America looks now, and that's certainly intentional", he said. "It's a way of pulling you into the story and allowing you to leave whatever cultural baggage you have about the founding fathers at the door." He noted "We're telling the story of old, dead white men but we're using actors of color, and that makes the story more immediate and more accessible to a contemporary audience."

The pro-immigration message of Hamilton is at the forefront, as the show revolves around the life of one of the Founding Fathers of the United States, Alexander Hamilton, and how he made his mark in American politics as an immigrant. Instead of being characterized as a white person, Alexander Hamilton's immigrant status is referenced throughout the show, along with the virtue and prowess of Hamilton ("by working a lot harder, by being a lot smarter, by being a self-starter", described in the show's opening, and later stating "immigrants, we get the job done"), in order to foster a positive image of immigrants. Alongside this, the casting of Black, Latino, and Asian American leads allowed audiences to literally view America as a nation of immigrants, and illustrate the "complex racial history and identity of America". "Hamilton is a story about America, and the most beautiful thing about it is ... it's told by such a diverse cast with such diverse styles of music", according to Renee Elise Goldsberry, who played Angelica Schuyler. "We have the opportunity to reclaim a history that some of us don't necessarily think is our own." Miranda has stated that he is "totally open" to women playing the Founding Fathers. Casting for the British production featured predominantly black British artists.

=== Historical accuracy ===
==== Chronology and events ====
Although Hamilton was based on historical events and people, Miranda did use some dramatic license in retelling the story. Here are the most prominent examples:

- In "Aaron Burr, Sir", Alexander Hamilton is depicted as having come to the United States in 1776; he came in 1773. In the same song, Hamilton meets with John Laurens, Hercules Mulligan, and Marquis de Lafayette shortly after arriving in New York. While it is true that Hamilton met Mulligan early during his time in New York, he only met Laurens and Lafayette after becoming George Washington's aide-de-camp. In addition, Lafayette did not come to the United States until after the war had started.
- In "My Shot", Hamilton describes himself as an abolitionist. Hamilton generally opposed slavery, but scholars have disputed if he could be described as an abolitionist. Despite once being the president of the New York Manumission Society, the fight against slavery was not considered a "mission" to him. His business dealings sometimes involved him in it; his father-in-law, Philip Schuyler, was a slave owner, as was George Washington. In the song "Stay Alive", Laurens says that he and Hamilton wrote essays against slavery; Hamilton did not write any essays against slavery. There is also some evidence that Hamilton could have owned slaves himself.
- While Angelica did have a strong relationship with Hamilton, it was exaggerated in the show. During "Satisfied", Angelica explains why Hamilton is not suitable for her despite wanting him; in particular, she states, "I'm a girl in a world in which my only job is to marry rich. My father has no sons so I'm the one who has to social climb for one." In actuality, Angelica had less pressure on her to do this: by 1780, Philip Schuyler actually had fourteen children, including two sons who survived into adulthood (one of whom was New York State Assemblyman Philip Jeremiah Schuyler); Philip Schuyler's fifteenth and last child, a daughter, was born in 1781. Angelica also eloped with John Barker Church three years before she met Hamilton at her sister's wedding, when she was already a mother of two of her eight children with Church. In addition, in "Take a Break", Angelica mentions that Hamilton put a comma in the wrong place in a letter to her, writing "my dearest,...". In reality, it was Angelica who did that. Hamilton noticed, and asked about it, with seemingly a bit of flirtatious hope in his question. Miranda stated that "[he] conveniently forgot that" for two reasons: because it is stronger dramatically if Angelica is available but cannot marry him; and, according to Hamilton: The Revolution, "in service of a larger point: Angelica is a world-class intellect in a world that does not allow her to flex it."
- In Act I, Aaron Burr's role in Hamilton's life is overstated, and much of the early interactions between the two men in the show are fictionalized (Miranda even explicitly notes that "Aaron Burr, Sir" is a fictional first meeting between Hamilton and Burr in Hamilton: The Revolution). For example, while Burr was present at the Battle of Monmouth, Burr did not serve as Charles Lee's second in his duel with John Laurens as seen in "Ten Duel Commandments"; Lee's second was Evan Edwards. Hamilton also never invited Burr to his wedding as seen in "The Story of Tonight", and never approached Burr to help write The Federalist Papers as portrayed in "Non-Stop"; in Hamilton: The Revolution, Miranda calls the scene "Another great What if? Historically, we know that Hamilton asked other people to contribute to The Federalist Papers: Madison and John Jay agreed, but Gouverneur Morris declined. I extended that into this fictional scene, wherein Hamilton invites Burr to write [The Federalist Papers]."
- In "A Winter's Ball", the character of Aaron Burr says that "... Martha Washington named her feral tomcat after [Hamilton]", to which Alexander Hamilton replies: "That's true!" In Hamilton: The Revolution, Miranda clarifies that it is false: "[It] is most likely a tale spread by John Adams later in life. But I like Hamilton owning it. At this point in the story he is at peak cockiness." Hamilton researchers Michael E. Newton and Stephen Knott say that they have failed to find any evidence for the story; Newton notes that the sexual connotation of tomcat as a womanizer did not exist in the 18th century.
- "Take a Break" revolves around Angelica joining the Hamiltons in America for the summer and preceding this with a letter about it to Alexander himself; no such events took place in real life.
  - In the same song, a nine-year-old Philip Hamilton claims, "I have a sister, but I want a little brother"; Philip already had two of his five younger brothers when he was age 9: Alexander Hamilton Jr. and James Alexander Hamilton. Miranda jokingly notes in Hamilton: The Revolution, "And, boy, did he get little brothers! Five of them, actually, and two sisters."
- While it is true that John Adams and Hamilton did not particularly get along, Adams did not fire Hamilton as told in the show. Hamilton himself tendered his resignation from his position as Secretary of the Treasury on December 1, 1794, two years before Adams became president. However, Hamilton remained close friends with Washington and highly influential in the political sphere until publishing a pamphlet criticizing Adams during the election of 1800, an event referenced in "The Adams Administration".
- In regards to the creation and reception of The Reynolds Pamphlet, Jefferson, Madison, and Burr did not approach Hamilton about his affair after John Adams became president; it was actually James Monroe, Frederick Muhlenberg, and Abraham Venable in December 1792. Monroe was a close friend of Jefferson's and shared the information of Hamilton's affair with him. In summer 1797, journalist James T. Callender broke the story of Hamilton's infidelity; this is why the impact of The Reynolds Pamphlet's publication is exaggerated in the show. Hamilton blamed Monroe and challenged him to a duel, which was averted due to the intervention of Burr. With nothing left to do, Hamilton then published The Reynolds Pamphlet.
- In "Blow Us All Away", George Eacker and Philip engage in a duel before the events of the 1800 presidential election; in said duel, the show has Eacker fire on Philip after seven paces. In reality, the duel occurred in 1801, with Philip Hamilton dying on November 24; furthermore, both men refused to fire for over a minute before Eacker shot Philip in the hips.
- In "The Election of 1800", Madison tells Jefferson that he won the election in a landslide. The final vote count in the House of Representatives was 10 votes for Jefferson, 4 votes for Burr, and 2 blank ballots, meaning a division of 62.5% of the votes were for Jefferson against 25% for Burr.
- It was not the presidential election of 1800 that led to Burr and Hamilton's duel. Burr did become Jefferson's vice-president, but when Jefferson decided not to run with Burr for reelection in 1804, Burr opted to run for Governor of New York instead; Burr lost to Morgan Lewis in a landslide. Afterward, a letter was published in The Albany Register from Charles D. Cooper to Philip Schuyler, claiming that Hamilton called Burr "a dangerous man and one who ought not be trusted with the reins of government", and that he knew of "a still more despicable opinion which General Hamilton has expressed of Mr. Burr". This led to the letters between Burr and Hamilton as seen in "Your Obedient Servant".

==== Critical analysis and scholarship ====
The show has been critiqued for a simplistic depiction of Hamilton and vilification of Jefferson. Joanne B. Freeman, a history professor at Yale, contrasted the show's Hamilton to the "real Hamilton [who] was a mass of contradictions: an immigrant who sometimes distrusted immigrants, a revolutionary who placed a supreme value on law and order, a man who distrusted the rumblings of the masses yet preached his politics to them more frequently and passionately than many of his more democracy-friendly fellows".

Australian historian Shane White found the framing of the show's story "troubling", stating that he and many historian colleagues "would like to imagine that Hamilton is a last convulsion of the founding father mythology". According to White, Miranda's depiction of the founding of the United States "infuses new life into an older view of American history" that centered on the Founding Fathers, instead of joining the many historians who were "attempting to get away from the Great Men story" by incorporating "ordinary people, African-Americans, Native Americans and women" into a "more inclusive and nuanced" historical narrative in which Hamilton has a "cameo rather than leading role".

Rutgers University professor Lyra Monteiro criticized the show's multi-ethnic casting as obscuring a complete lack of identifiable enslaved or free persons of color as characters in the show. Monteiro identified other commentators, such as Ishmael Reed, who criticized the show for making Hamilton and other historical personages appear more progressive on racial injustice than they really were.

In The Baffler, policy analyst Matt Stoller criticized the musical's portrayal of Hamilton as an idealist committed to democratic principles, in contrast to what he characterized as the historical record of Hamilton's reactionary, anti-democratic politics and legacy. For example, Stoller cited Hamilton as a leader involved in the Newburgh conspiracy (a potential conspiracy against the Continental Congress in 1783); his development of a national financial system which, in Stoller's view, empowered the wealthy; and his use of military force, indefinite detention, and mass arrests against participants in the Whiskey Rebellion of 1791. Stoller cited history writer William Hogeland, who, in 2007, criticized Chernow's biography of Hamilton on similar grounds in the Boston Review.

In 2018, Historians on Hamilton: How a Blockbuster Musical Is Restaging America's Past was published. Fifteen historians of early America authored essays on ways the musical both engages with and sometimes misinterprets history.

Theatre scholars Meredith Conti and Meron Langsner have both published written analyses of the place of firearms and dueling in the musical.

Writer and essayist Ishmael Reed wrote and produced the 2019 play The Haunting of Lin-Manuel Miranda, which critiques Hamilton's historical inaccuracies. The play, directed by Rome Neal and partially funded by Toni Morrison, had an initial run in May 2019 at Nuyorican Poets Cafe and was produced again in October 2019.

Philosopher Michael Sandel critiques Hamilton for its oversimplistic multiculturalism, avoidance of discussions on Hamilton's financial doctrines, and a blind embrace of liberal meritocracy in his 2022 edition of Democracy's Discontent.

=== Use in education ===
KQED News wrote of a "growing number of intrepid U.S. history teachers ... who are harnessing the Hamilton phenomenon to inspire their students". The Cabinet rap battles provide a way to engage students with topics that have traditionally been considered uninteresting. An elective course for 11th and 12th graders on the musical Hamilton was held at the Ethical Culture Fieldston School in New York. KQED News added that "Hamilton is especially galvanizing for the student who believes that stories about 18th century America are distant and irrelevant" as it shows the Founding Fathers were real humans with real feeling and real flaws, rather than "bloodless, two-dimensional cutouts who devoted their lives to abstract principles". A high school teacher from the Bronx noted his students were "singing these songs the way they might sing the latest release from Drake or Adele". One teacher focused on Hamilton's ability to write his way out of trouble and toward a higher plane of existence: "skilled writing is the clearest sign of scholarship—and the best way to rise up and alter your circumstance."

Hamilton's producers have made a pledge to allow 20,000 New York City public high school students from low-income families to get subsidized tickets to see Hamilton on Broadway by reducing their tickets to $70 for students, and the Rockefeller Foundation provided $1.5 million to further lower ticket prices to $10 per student. The Gilder Lehrman Institute of American History created a study guide to accompany the student-ticket program.

Through a private grant, over the course of the 2017 school year, nearly 20,000 Chicago Public Schools students got to see a special performance of the show, and some got to perform original songs on stage prior to the show.

The website EducationWorld writes that Hamilton is "being praised for its revitalization of interest in civic education". Northwestern University announced plans to offer course work in 2017 inspired by Hamilton, in history, Latino studies, and interdisciplinary studies.

In 2016, Moraine Valley Community College started a Hamilton appreciation movement, Straight Outta Hamilton, hosting panels and events that talk about the musical itself and relate them to current events.

== Legacy and impact ==
=== $10 bill ===
In 2015, the U.S. Department of the Treasury announced a redesign to the $10 bill, with plans to replace Hamilton with a then-undecided woman from American history. Possibly due to Hamilton's surging popularity, then-United States Treasury Secretary Jack Lew reversed the plans to replace Hamilton's portrait, instead deciding to replace Andrew Jackson with Harriet Tubman on the $20 bill. This decision would later be reversed by the first Trump administration, with Harriet Tubman replacing neither Hamilton or Jackson.

=== Hamilton: The Revolution ===
External videos
- Presentation by Jeremy McCarter on Hamilton: The Revolution, June 11, 2016, C-SPAN

On April 12, 2016, Miranda and Jeremy McCarter's book, Hamilton: The Revolution, was released, detailing Hamilton's journey from an idea to a successful Broadway musical. It includes an inside look at not only Alexander Hamilton's revolution, but the cultural revolution that permeates the show. It also has footnotes from Miranda and stories from behind the scenes of the show. The book won a Goodreads Choice Award for Nonfiction in 2016, and the audiobook won Audiobook of the Year at the Audie Awards 2017 from the Audio Publishers Association.

=== Hamilton's America ===
After premiering on the New York Film Festival on October 1, 2016, PBS's Great Performances exhibited on October 21, 2016, the documentary Hamilton's America. Directed by Alex Horwitz, it "delves even deeper into the creation of the show, revealing Miranda's process of absorbing and then adapting Hamilton's epic story into groundbreaking musical theater. Further fleshing out the story is newly shot footage of the New York production with its original cast, trips to historic locations such as Mount Vernon and Valley Forge with Miranda and other cast members, and a range of interviews with prominent personalities, experts, politicians, and musicians." The film featured interviews with American historians and Hamilton authorities, and currently has a 100% rating on Rotten Tomatoes.

=== Hamilton: The Exhibition ===
Hamilton: The Exhibition was an interactive museum, which focused on the history concerning the life of Alexander Hamilton and also the musical. Designed to travel, it debuted in Chicago in April 2019. Located in a specially built structure on Northerly Island, according to theater critic Chris Jones, the exhibition marks something that "no Broadway show ever has attempted before". Lead producer of the exhibition was musical producer Jeffrey Seller, the artistic designer was David Korins, and the main historical consultant was Yale University professor Joanne Freeman. Alex Lacamoire provided the orchestration for the exhibit (in part, a take-off on the Hamilton score), and Lin-Manuel Miranda, actors, and historians provided recorded presentations.

Hamilton: The Exhibition shut down on August 25, 2019, and plans to move the exhibition elsewhere were cancelled. Refunds were issued for tickets purchased for August 26 to September 8.

=== Hamilton for Puerto Rico ===
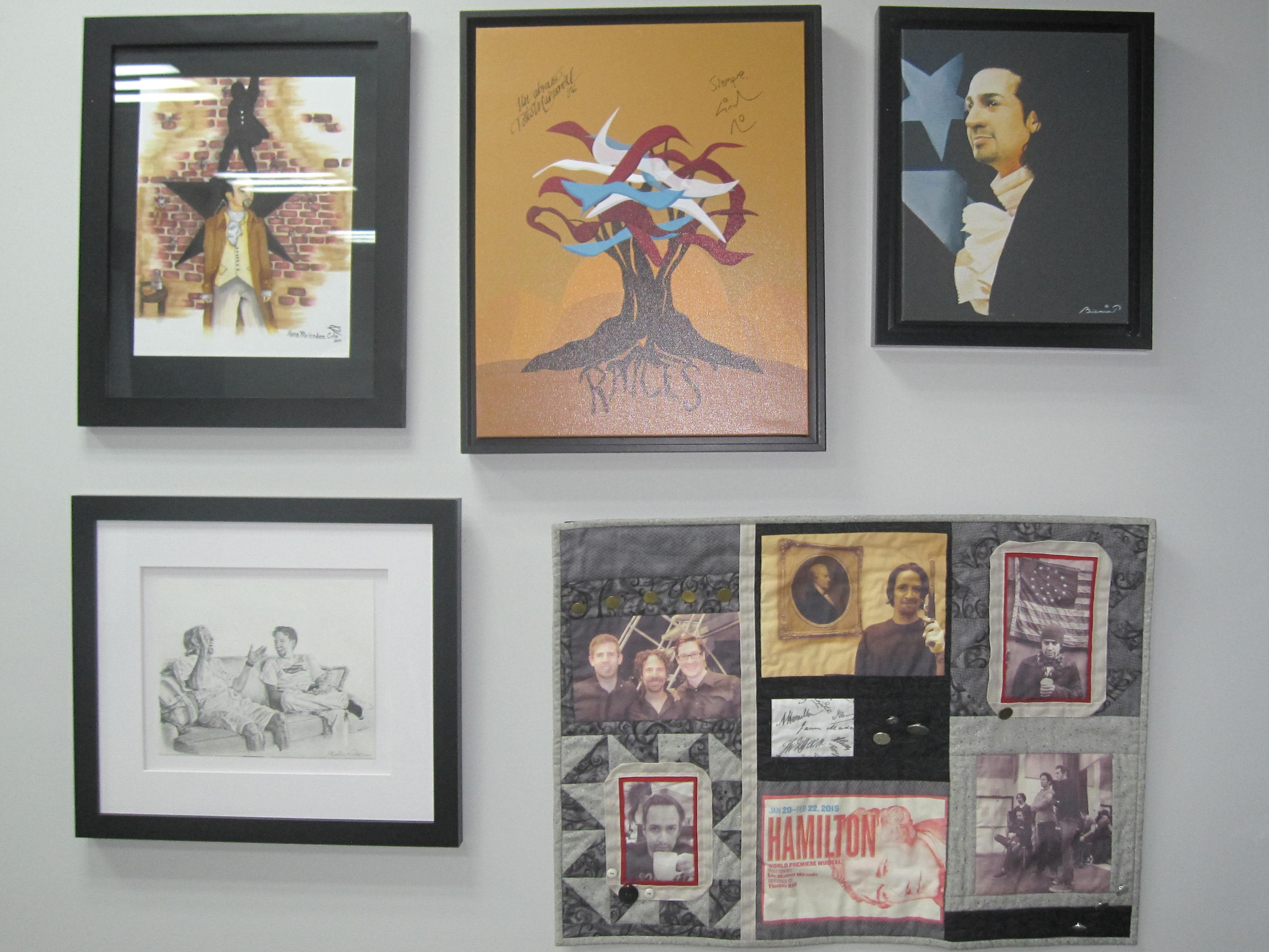
Lin-Manuel Miranda Gallery at Vega Alta barrio-pueblo in Puerto Rico

After Hurricane Maria, Lin-Manuel Miranda with family roots in Vega Alta, Puerto Rico used his influence to bring attention to the plight of the Puerto Rican people and to encourage tourism to Vega Alta. In 2017, Miranda and his father, Luis Miranda Jr., inaugurated the Placita Güisín, a café and restaurant in Vega Alta barrio-pueblo. In 2019, Lin-Manuel moved his memorabilia to a new gallery, the Lin-Manuel Miranda Gallery, within the Placita Güisín and opened a merchandise store, TeeRico. The location has become a tourist attraction.

=== 2016 Vice President–elect Pence controversy ===
Following a performance on November 18, 2016, with Vice President-elect Mike Pence in the audience, Brandon Victor Dixon addressed Pence from the stage with a statement jointly written by the cast, show creator Lin-Manuel Miranda and producer Jeffrey Seller. Dixon began by quieting the audience, and stated:

Vice President-elect Pence, we welcome you and we truly thank you for joining us here at Hamilton: An American Musical, we really do. We, sir,—we—are the diverse America who are alarmed and anxious that your new administration will not protect us, our planet, our children, our parents, or defend us and uphold our inalienable rights, sir. But we truly hope that this show has inspired you to uphold our American values and to work on behalf of all of us. All of us. Again, we truly thank you truly for seeing this show, this wonderful American story told by a diverse group of men and women of different colors, creeds and orientations.

Pence listened to the expression of concern about President-elect Donald Trump's upcoming administration and later expressed that he was not offended. However, Trump demanded an apology for what he described on Twitter as the cast having "harassed" Pence. This led to an online campaign called "#BoycottHamilton", which became widely mocked as the show was already sold out months in advance. Trump was criticized by The Washington Post, who noted the division between white and non-white America in the 2016 Presidential election and suggested Trump could have offered "assurances that he would be a president for all Americans—that he would respect everybody regardless of race or gender or creed"; instead, as presidential historian Robert Dallek expressed, Trump's Twitter response was a "striking act of divisiveness by an incoming president struggling to heal the nation after a bitter election", with the Hamilton cast a proxy for those fearful of Trump's policies and rhetoric. Jeffrey Seller, the show's lead producer, said that while Trump has not seen Hamilton or inquired about tickets, he is "welcome to attend".

=== Parodies ===
In April 2016, Jeb! The Musical appeared on the Internet with Jeb Bush in the place of Alexander Hamilton, with political figures like Donald Trump and Chris Christie holding supporting roles. A staged reading, given "just as much preparation as Jeb's campaign", was staged at Northwestern University in June of that year. The parody was crowdsourced, with contributions coming from a range of writers from Yale University, Boston University, McGill University and the University of Michigan, who met in a Facebook group named "Post Aesthetics".

In 2016, Gerard Alessandrini, creator of Forbidden Broadway, wrote the revue Spamilton, which premiered at the Triad Theater in New York and also played at the Royal George Theatre in Chicago. It parodies Hamilton and other Broadway shows and caricatures various Broadway stars.

On October 12, 2016, the American situation comedy Modern Family released the episode "Weathering Heights". The episode features a scene where Manny applies for college. To do so he records a parody of "Alexander Hamilton" as part of his application, complete with rewritten lyrics to accompany to his own life. It is revealed that most of the other applications are also Hamilton parodies.

The 2022 Transformers: BotBots episode "I, Cheeseburger" prominently features a musical of the same name that directly parodies Hamilton, including an identical poster for the performance and fast-food-themed versions of several songs.

"Weird Al" Yankovic recorded a polka medley of Hamilton songs in 2018 as part of the Hamildrops program, following it up in 2020 with a video using footage from the filmed version.

==== Scamilton production ====
In 2022, a church in Texas, known as The Door Christian Fellowship produced an illegal version of Hamilton referred to online as Scamilton. The performance was live streamed to the church's YouTube channel on August 5, 2022 and reuploaded onto YouTube by a different user on August 28, 2022.

=== Ham4Progress ===
Ham4Progress is a group of Hamilton cast members and staff that provides a platform for supporting social justice causes.

==== Education ====
The Hamilton Education Program was founded in 2016 with funding from the Rockefeller Foundation. It is a collaboration between the producers of Hamilton, the Miranda Family, and the Gilder Lehrman Institute of American History. Together they established the Ham4Progress Award for Educational Advancement, an award supporting "college-bound high school juniors from communities that directly experience the consequences of social injustice and/or discrimination".

==== Civic engagement ====
Hamilton, in partnership with Michelle Obama's When We All Vote, released "The Election of 2022", a video for National Voter Registration Day to encourage voting. Voter registration and get out the vote activities have been advanced by tumblr. Ohio State University held an on campus voter registration and voter awareness event sponsored by Ham4Progress. VoteRiders and VoteForward are partner organizations dedicated to voter education and enablement.

In 2021, Justice Sonia Sotomayor and Lin-Manuel Miranda discussed democracy, civics, inclusion and opportunity.

Additionally, Ham4Progress has supported environmental issues by collaborating with NRDC.

==== Racial justice ====
On February 3, 2021, Hamilton Families with Hamilton cast member Christopher Henry Young, joined by staff and supporters of Hamilton Families, speaking to them about addressing family homelessness in the SF Bay Area.

In 2021, Ham4Progress presented "The Joy In Our Voices" hosted by Wayne Brady and featuring Lin-Manuel Miranda, Senator Cory Booker, poet and activist Amanda Gorman, Senator Reverend Raphael Warnock, CBS' Gayle King, and members of Hamilton performing original pieces highlighting Black art and artists for Black History Month.

Ham4Progress posted that May is Asian & Pacific American Heritage month. Jon M. Chu, director of the 2021 In the Heights movie, talked about AAPI representation in the industry with Hamilton cast members Marcus Choi and Taeko McCaroll.

==== Gender equality ====
Abortion rights has been promoted by fundraising activities for The Brigid Alliance and Planned Parenthood.

Trans rights have been supported through collaboration with the Trans Youth Equality Foundation, an American non-profit dedicated to providing support and advocacy for young transgender individuals and their families.

== Adaptations ==
=== Filmed stage production ===
Several 2016 stage performances with the original principal cast in the Richard Rodgers Theatre were filmed by RadicalMedia and offered for bidding to major movie studios. On February 3, 2020, Walt Disney Studios acquired the distribution rights for $75 million, with an original theatrical release date on October 15, 2021, under the Walt Disney Pictures banner. Miranda later announced on May 12, 2020, that in light of the impact of the COVID-19 pandemic on the film industry and the performing arts, which shut down the Broadway, West End, and touring productions, the film would be released early on Disney+ on July 3, 2020, in time for Fourth of July weekend. Acclaimed by critics for its visuals, performances, and direction, it became one of the most-streamed films of 2020. The film was named as one of the best films of 2020 by the American Film Institute, and was nominated for Best Motion Picture – Musical or Comedy and Best Actor in a Motion Picture – Musical or Comedy (for Miranda) at the 78th Golden Globe Awards, while Daveed Diggs was nominated for Screen Actors Guild Award for Outstanding Male Actor in a Limited Series or Television Movie. Hamilton also received 12 nominations at the 73rd Primetime Emmy Award nominations, including Outstanding Lead Actor for Miranda and Odom Jr., Outstanding Supporting Actor for Groff, Ramos and Diggs, and Outstanding Supporting Actress for Soo and Goldsberry.

The film saw a wide theatrical release in the United States and Canada on September 5, 2025, to celebrate the musical's tenth anniversary. This exhibition features new "Reuniting the Revolution" interviews with the original cast and creators. The release, in 1,825 screens, grossed $10.1 million, ranking second at the box office behind fellow newcomer The Conjuring: Last Rites. Further cinema releases are scheduled in the United Kingdom and Ireland on September 26, and Australia and New Zealand on November 13, 2025.

=== Potential film adaptation ===
On February 10, 2017, Miranda speculated that a film adaptation of Hamilton would eventually be made, but "not for years, so that people have ample time to see the stage version first". On July 6, 2020, after the release of the live film recording of the stage version on Disney+, Miranda stated, "I don't love a lot of movie musicals based on shows, because it's hard to stick the landing ... I don't know what a cinematic version of Hamilton looks like. If I had, I'd have written it as a movie." In December 2024, following the critical and commercial success of Universal Pictures' Wicked, the first installment of that musical's two-part film adaptation, interest grew again for an actual screen adaptation of Hamilton, with Miranda feeling that the property should wait at least "10 more years" given the success of the live film recording, but did say "But if someone's got an idea, holla at me."

== See also ==
- 1776, a 1969 musical about the signing of the Declaration of Independence
- Hamilton, 1917 play
- Bloody Bloody Andrew Jackson, a 2010 historical rock musical about America's seventh President, Andrew Jackson, and the founding of the Democratic Party
- Latino theater in the United States
- List of musicals filmed live on stage
- List of plays and musicals about the American Revolution
- List of Tony Award records
