= The Election of 1800 =

Song from the Broadway musical Hamilton

Song by Daveed Diggs, Okieriete Onaodowan, Leslie Odom Jr., Lin-Manuel Miranda, and the Original Broadway Cast of Hamilton

from the album Hamilton
- Released: September 25, 2015
- Length: 3:57
- Songwriter: Lin-Manuel Miranda

Audio
- "The Election on 1800" on YouTube

"The Election of 1800" is the nineteenth song in the second act of Hamilton, a 2015 Broadway musical on the life of Alexander Hamilton. In the song, Thomas Jefferson and Aaron Burr's attempts to win the 1800 United States presidential election result in a tie, that Hamilton is portrayed as helping to resolve. However, the song includes several historical inaccuracies—most notably, that Hamilton did not formally break the tie in the actual election.

== Synopsis ==
The song presents Miranda's retelling of the 1800 United States presidential election. After the emotional ending of the previous song, Thomas Jefferson lightens the mood by asking if they can "get back to politics" to which James Madison—still crying—agrees. John Adams, who does not appear in the play, is said to have no chance of winning the presidency, leaving the main contest between Jefferson and Aaron Burr, both actively campaigning. Alexander Hamilton, who dislikes both Jefferson and Burr, is still mourning the death of his son, is repeatedly asked whom he supports but initially refuses to answer. He briefly speaks with Burr, who admits he would do anything to become president. When the race ends in a tie, Hamilton is called upon to break the deadlock. To everyone’s surprise, he throws his support to Jefferson. Although he admits he and Jefferson have never agreed on anything, he argues, "Jefferson has beliefs. Burr has none." Burr remains hopeful about becoming vice president, but Jefferson, distrustful of him, uses his new power to change the law so that the runner-up no longer assumes the role. In the final line, Jefferson smugly tells Burr to thank Hamilton for his endorsement. This leads directly into the next song, "Your Obedient Servant", where Burr, enraged, challenges Hamilton to a duel.

== Historical differences ==
While Burr is portrayed in the song as running for president, it was widely understood at the time that Jefferson was the Democratic-Republican Party's presidential candidate, whereas Burr was intended to be the vice-presidential candidate. However, Burr notably declined to say he would not accept the presidency if elected.

The tie between Jefferson and Burr resulted from a flaw in the original rules of the Electoral College—the constitutional process used to elect the president and vice president. Under the original system, each elector cast two votes: the candidate with the most votes became president, and the runner-up became vice president. When political parties began running both presidential and vice-presidential candidates, it became clear that this system could lead to a tie between running mates. Since Jefferson and Burr were from the same party, electors from states they had won voted for both, creating a tie. In such cases, the United States House of Representatives decides the winner, with each state delegation casting one vote. To undermine the Democratic-Republican Party, Federalist Party-controlled delegations cast their votes for Burr, preventing either candidate from reaching the required nine out of sixteen delegations. While Alexander Hamilton lobbied Federalist delegations to support Jefferson—largely for the reasons dramatized in the song—it was Representative James Bayard of Delaware who ultimately cast the deciding vote that secured Jefferson's presidency.

While Madison tells Jefferson near the end of the song that he won the election in a landslide, the Tampa Bay Times notes this was not the case.

== Reaction and impact ==
Writing for the Journal of the Early Republic, Nancy Isenberg criticized the accuracy of the song, writing that the event had been "distorted beyond recognition" by Miranda.

In Chiafalo v. Washington, a case before the Supreme Court of the United States, Justice Elena Kagan alluded to "The Election of 1800" in handing down her decision. While writing about past contested presidential elections, Kagan parenthetically commented that "Alexander Hamilton secured his place on the Broadway stage—but possibly in the cemetery too—by lobbying Federalists in the House to tip the election to Jefferson".

== Reprisal ==
External videos
- Revised lyrics for "The Election of 1800", from When We All Vote on Instagram

In 2020, cast members from Hamilton performed modified lyrics for "The Election of 1800", among other songs, to encourage turnout in the 2020 United States elections in partnership with When We All Vote, an initiative started by Michelle Obama. Instead of singing about the contest between Jefferson and Burr, the new lyrics emphasize the importance of the then-upcoming election. For example, while the original lyrics when Hamilton was first approached about Jefferson and Burr were "Dear Mr. Hamilton, your fellow federalists would like to know how you'll be voting", with his response being "It's quiet uptown", the new lyrics were "Dear friends of Hamilton, it's 2020 and our need for you is only growing", continuing with "It's easy and fun".
