= Out of the Everywhere (Upstairs, Downstairs) =

- Upstairs, Downstairs episode
- Episode no.: Season 2 Episode 8
- Directed by: Christopher Hodson
- Written by: Terence Brady & Charlotte Bingham
- Original air date: 8 December 1972

Guest appearances
- Daphne Heard (Nanny Webster); Helen Lindsay (Mrs Wills); Denis McCarthy (Rev. Pullen); Michael Moore (Verger); Trevor Roberts (Hansom Cab Driver); Liesl Dallinson (Baby Lucy); Sarah MacDonald (Godmother)

Episode chronology
← Previous "Your Obedient Servant"	Next → "An Object of Value"

"Out of the Everywhere" is the eighth episode of the second series of the British television series, Upstairs, Downstairs. The episode is set in 1909.

== Plot ==
Elizabeth Kirbridge gives birth to a daughter, Lucy Elizabeth, in a London nursing home. To avoid scandal and since Lawrence is the legal father, he is asked to attend the baby's christening. Following the ceremony, he is never heard from again. Elizabeth, lacking maternal feelings, is indifferent to the baby and content to have Lucy be brought up in the nursery by a very old and ill nanny. But later Sarah becomes Baby Lucy's nursery maid and she saves Elizabeth's baby from the clumsy hands of Nanny Webster.

== Cast ==
=== Regular cast ===
- Mrs Bridges
- Hudson
- Sarah
- Lady Marjorie Bellamy
- Richard Bellamy
- Elizabeth Kirbridge
- Lawrence Kirbridge
- Edward
- Roberts

=== Guest cast ===
- Daphne Heard (Nanny Webster)
- Helen Lindsay (Mrs Wills)
- Denis McCarthy (Rev. Pullen)
- Michael Moore (Verger)
- Trevor Roberts (Hansom Cab Driver)
- Liesl Dallinson (Baby Lucy)
- Sarah MacDonald (Godmother)
