= The Property of a Lady (Upstairs, Downstairs) =

- Upstairs, Downstairs episode
- Episode no.: Season 2 Episode 6
- Directed by: Derek Bennett
- Written by: Alfred Shaughnessy
- Original air date: 24 November 1972

Guest appearance
- Desmond Perry (Mr. Dooley)

Episode chronology
← Previous "Guest of Honour"	Next → "Your Obedient Servant"

"The Property of a Lady" is the sixth episode of the second series of the British television series, Upstairs, Downstairs. The episode is set in 1909.

"The Property of a Lady" was among the episodes omitted from Upstairs, Downstairs' initial Masterpiece Theatre broadcast in 1974, and was consequently not shown on US television until 1989.

== Plot ==
Mr Dooley arrives at Eaton Place with a packet of love letters that Lady Marjorie had written to her much younger lover, Captain Charles Victor Hammond of the Khyber Rifles regiment and a friend of her son James. Dooley had been Hammond's military batman (personal attendant). Hammond, by then a major, was later killed during a battle in India in 1909 and was awarded the Victoria Cross.

Rebuffed at the front door of 165 Eaton Place by the butler Mr Hudson as an "unwashed Irish vagrant", Dooley goes with the love letters round to the mews to make himself agreeable to Thomas the chauffeur. In a con trick by the chauffeur, who was given the letters for the purpose of negotiating with Lady Marjorie, monies are extorted from both of the Bellamys, each unknown to the other, with the result that ends with Mr Dooley in jail on an unrelated charge, and all monies restored to the individuals—with Thomas receiving a gratuity from each of the Bellamys.

== Cast ==
Regular cast

- Rachel Gurney (Lady Marjorie Bellamy)
- Gordon Jackson (Mr. Angus Hudson)
- Angela Baddeley (Mrs. Kate Bridges)
- Jean Marsh (Rose Bucke)
- David Langton (Richard Bellamy)
- Pauline Collins (Sarah Moffat)
- Christopher Beeny (Edward)
- Patsy Smart (Roberts)
- Jenny Tomasin (Ruby)

Guest cast

- Desmond Perry (Mr. Dooley)
