= Daphne Heard =

British actress (1904–1983)

- Heard as Nanny Webster in the episode "Out of the Everywhere" of Upstairs, Downstairs
- Born: Delia Phyllis Daphne Heard; 21 August 1904; Plymouth, England
- Died: 22 June 1983 (aged 78); Bristol, England
- Occupations: Actress, acting tutor
- Years active: 1922–1982

Delia Phyllis Daphne Heard (21 August 1904 – 22 June 1983) was an English actress and acting teacher. She was born in Plymouth, Devon. She appeared in numerous made-for-TV movies and TV series. She was perhaps best known in later years as Richard DeVere's elderly mother Mrs. Polouvicka in To the Manor Born.

== Early life ==
Heard got her first taste of acting when she sang in an end of term play whilst at kindergarten school in Southampton around 1908. This caused her to decide to become an actress but her parents (her father being a ship's engineer then an inspector of ships for the Board of Trade and her mother a suffragette) initially tried to dissuade her. In the end, they allowed their daughter at the age of 16 to attend the Royal Central School of Speech and Drama for training. There, Heard attended with John Laurie and trained under Elsie Fogerty.

== Theatre ==
Her career starting in 1922, Heard joined the Lena Ashwell Players the following year, playing lead roles. In 1925, she joined Sir Barry Jackson's company in The New Morality at the Kingsway Theatre followed by touring in plays such as The Green Hat and The Beaux' Stratagem. Rejoining Jackson's company in 1928, she appeared at the Birmingham Repertory Theatre and Malvern Festival, as well as touring in Canada.

During the Second World War, Heard worked in the prisoner of war section of the Red Cross and afterwards joined the Bristol Old Vic. By 1968 she accepted Sir Laurence Olivier's offer to join the National Theatre.

== Film ==
Her film credits include roles in Goodbye Gemini (1970), the film version of Please Sir! (1971) as an old gypsy, Jude the Obscure (1971) as Drusilla Fawley, and The Triple Echo (1972). She also appeared as the nanny in Laurence Olivier's film Three Sisters (1970) based on the Anton Chekhov play, with Joan Plowright, Alan Bates and Olivier himself as Chebutikin.

== Television and radio ==
In 1966, she was cast as a beleaguered tenant in Vacant Possession, a TV play produced by Rediffusion. In 1971, Heard starred in a couple of episodes in the TV sitcom For the Love of Ada playing the nosey next door neighbour. In 1974, she played the part of Mrs. Froggitt in the pilot episode of Oh No It's Selwyn Froggitt.

She performed in many other television serials, including Wild, Wild Women, Doctor Who (in the serial Image of the Fendahl), the sitcom Don't Forget to Write!, Z-Cars and Upstairs, Downstairs, series 2, episode 8, "Out of the Everywhere".

From its inception until her death in 1983, she played the part of Maud, the eccentric housekeeper, in the Hinge and Bracket radio series.

== Teaching career ==
In 1955, Heard left the cast of a West End play starring Yvonne Arnaud to take up teaching drama at the Bristol Old Vic Theatre School. She spent seven years working there, resigning in 1962 after a disagreement with the new principal Richard Ainley over the school's new policies. During this time, her pupils included Peter O'Toole, Brian Blessed, Robin Phillips and Patrick Stewart.

== Filmography ==
Title	Year	Role
Yellow Sands (TV movie)	1948	Jennifer Varwell
Miranda (TV movie)	1949	Nurse Carey
Rest You Merry (TV movie)	1958	Jin
The True Misery of the Passion (TV movie)	1960	Despair
Lorna Doone (TV series; eleven episodes; erased by BBC)	1963	Betty Maxworthy
Compact	1963	Mrs. Metcalfe
Viewpoint	1963	Actress
Story Parade	1964	Mrs. Poulton-Morse
The Children of the New Forest (TV series; six episodes)	1964	Judith Villiers
Thursday Theatre (TV anthology series)	1964	Mrs. Dorbeil
Esther Waters	1964	Mrs. Latch
The Walrus and the Carpenter (TV series)	1965	
Undermind (TV series)	1965	Mrs. Neary
Poison Island (TV series)	1965	Mrs. Stimcoe
Thirteen Against Fate (episode "The Witness")	1966	Madame Naquet
The Woman in White	1966	Madame Fosco
Blackmail	1966	Mrs. Pearce
Macbeth (TV movie)	1966	Third Witch
ITV Play of the Week (TV series)	1967	Witness
Sanctuary (TV series)	1967	Mrs. Evans
Boy Meets Girl (TV series). 24 wiped BBCTV episodes.	1967	Mary
Hobson's Choice (BBC Schools)	1967	Mrs. Hepworth
Softly, Softly (TV series)	1967	Mrs Evans - Mrs Peck
Inheritance (TV series)	1967	Janie Mellor
Dr. Finlay's Casebook (TV series)	1964-1968	3 character roles: Grandma, Mrs. McNaughton, and Mrs. Verrier
Public Eye (TV series)	1968	Nora
Nicholas Nickleby (TV series)	1968	Peg Sliderskew
Mr. Rose (TV series)	1968	Mrs. Simmons
City '68 (TV series)	1968	Miss Barnes
The Wednesday Play 1968	1968	Mrs. Edgell - Nan
Nearest and Dearest (TV series sitcom)	1968	Mrs. Hardman
Wild, Wild Women (TV series)	1969	Ginny
Big Breadwinner Hog (TV series)	1969	Mrs. Lennox
Rogues' Gallery (TV series)	1969	Grandma Groom
The Expert (TV series)	1969	Mrs. Dipper
The First Churchills (TV miniseries)	1969	Mrs. Jennings
Ace of Wands (TV series)	1970	Ma Epps
Goodbye Gemini	1970	Mrs. McLaren
Three Sisters	1970	Anfissa
The Emergency of Anthony Purdy Esq, Farmer's Labourer (TV movie)	1970	Mother
ITV Saturday Night Theatre	1971	Mrs. Castleton
Jude the Obscure (serial)	1971	Drusilla Fawley
For the Love of Ada (TV series)	1971	Mrs. Chandler
Z-Cars (TV series)	1964-1971	Various - 3 character roles
Thick as Thieves (TV movie)	1971	
Please Sir!	1971	Old Gypsy Lady
Thirty-Minute Theatre (TV series)	1971	Mrs. Norton
Owen, M.D. (TV series)	1971	Mary Brough
Suspicion (TV series)	1972	Mrs. Fawcett
The Fenn Street Gang (TV series)	1972	Mrs. Upjohn
Spyder's Web (TV series)	1972	Mrs. Hartley
Horace (TV movie)	1972	Mrs.Beal
Pretenders (TV series)	1972	Carrity
The Triple Echo (AKA Soldier in Skirts, in US)	1972	Shopkeeper
Upstairs, Downstairs (TV series)	1972	Nanny Webster
Cranford (TV series)	1972	Mrs. Fitz-Adams
Country Matters (TV series)	1972	Cassandra
Arthur of the Britons (TV series)	1973	Elder
Whatever Happened to the Likely Lads? (TV series)	1973	Aunt Beattie
The Jensen Code (TV series)	1973	Granny Powell
Orson Welles Great Mysteries (TV series)	1973	Deborah Crabbe
The Kids from 47A (TV series)	1974	Miss Budge
John Halifax, Gentleman (TV series)	1974	Jael
Oh No It's Selwyn Froggitt (TV series)	1974	Florrie Froggitt
BBC Play of the Month (TV series)	1970-1974	3 character roles
Horizon (TV series)	1974	Magistrate
Churchill's People (TV series)	1975	Old Woman
Wodehouse Playhouse (TV series)	1975	Nanny Wilkes
Village Hall (TV series)	1975	Mrs. Goodchild
Comedy Playhouse	1974-1975	Aunty Vee - Mum
Plays for Britain (TV series)	1976	Mrs. Brown
Westway (TV series)	1976	Miss Marlbury
Angels (TV series)	1976	Edith Dawson
Within These Walls (TV series)	1976	Ralda Loveridge
Murder Most English: A Flaxborough Chronicle (TV series)	1977	Mrs. Crunkinghorn
Marie Curie (TV miniseries)	1977	Madame Sophie Curie
The Upchat Line (TV series)	1977	Mrs. Burgess
Doctor Who (TV series) – in serial Image of the Fendahl	1977	Martha Tyler
Hazell (TV series)	1978	Kathleen Donaldson
Crown Court (TV series)	1974-1978	4 character roles
Coronation Street (TV series)	1978	Lizzie Hinchcliffe
Don't Forget to Write (TV series)	1977-1979	Mrs. Field
Late Night Drama (TV series)	1980	Mrs. Woon
Nanny (TV series)	1981	Miss Cooper
John Keats (TV miniseries)	1981	Mrs. Cook
To the Manor Born (TV series)	1979-1981	Maria Polouvicka
Play for Today (TV series)	1982	Mrs Merridew
Horace (TV series)	1982	Mrs. Tiddy
