= Miguel Cervantes (actor) =

American actor, singer and activist

- Born: January 9, 1976 (age 50)
- Occupations: Actor, singer, activist
- Notable work: Hamilton
- Spouse: Kelly
- Children: 2 (adopted daughter)

Miguel Cervantes is an American actor, singer and activist. He played the role of Alexander Hamilton in the Chicago production of Hamilton from September 2016 until the production closed in January 2020. He played the role in the Broadway production from March 3, 2020 to January 7, 2024.

== Career ==
A Dallas native, Cervantes graduated from Booker T. Washington High School for the Performing and Visual Arts in 1995 before attending Emerson College.

Prior to Hamilton, Cervantes had performed in the Broadway casts of American Idiot and If/Then. He was called to audition for Hamilton while the show transitioned from The Public Theater to Broadway's Richard Rodgers Theatre and then called back to perform a second time in front of a group that included producers and Hamilton writer and star Lin-Manuel Miranda. He subsequently booked the role in the Chicago production.

Critic Maureen Ryan praised Cervantes's "coiled intensity" in the role. The Chicago Tribune subsequently named Cervantes Chicagoan of the Year in theater.

After the Chicago production closed in 2020, Cervantes took over the lead role in the Broadway production. He announced in October 2023 that he would leave the role on January 7, 2024. Miranda appeared during Cervantes's final curtain call.

Cervantes has also performed in the digital musical A Killer Party: A Murder Mystery Musical.

Cervantes's screen career includes appearances on Madam Secretary, Person of Interest, and The Blacklist.

== Personal life ==
Cervantes and his family relocated to Chicago in the years following his casting in Hamilton. They have one son, Jackson, and a daughter adopted in 2023. An older daughter, Adelaide, suffered from infantile spasms, a severe form of epilepsy associated with developmental delays, and died in October 2019 at the age of 3. Adelaide's diagnosis happened around the time Cervantes was cast in Hamilton.

Cervantes's wife, Kelly Cervantes, is chair of the Chicago nonprofit CURE Epilepsy, an organization with which Miguel Cervantes is also active.

Cervantes took up golf while in the Chicago production of Hamilton and, with co-star Andrew Call, conceived the Shu Caddy, a combination tee holder, divot tool and ball marker that can clip onto a golfer's shoe or belt.

His family later relocated to New Jersey. After Cervantes left Hamilton, he established a batting cage facility near the family home, allowing him to support his son's passion for baseball.
