= Wild, Wild Women =

British TV sitcom (1968–1969)

- Title card
- Genre: Sitcom
- Starring: Barbara Windsor; Penelope Keith; Pat Coombs; Daphne Heard; Joan Sanderson; Derek Francis; Ronnie Stevens; Anna Karen; Paul Whitsun-Jones
- Country of origin: United Kingdom
- No. of episodes: 7 (6 missing)

Production
- Running time: 30 minutes

Original release
- Network: BBC1
- Release: 24 May 1968 – 10 February 1969

Wild, Wild Women is a British television sitcom that aired on BBC from 1968 to 1969. Shot in black-and-white, it starred Barbara Windsor and was written by Ronald Wolfe and Ronald Chesney.

== Cast ==
=== Pilot ===
- Barbara Windsor – Millie
- Derek Francis – Mr Harcourt
- Penelope Keith – Daisy
- Sonia Fox – Ruby
- Jennie Paul – Blossom
- Ronnie Stevens – Clarence
- David Stoll – Lord Hurlingham
- Zena Howard – Lady Hurlingham

=== Series ===
- Barbara Windsor – Millie
- Paul Whitsun-Jones – Mr Harcourt
- Pat Coombs – Daisy
- Ken Platt – Albert
- Toni Palmer – Ruby
- Jessie Robins – Blossom
- Daphne Heard – Ginny
- Yvonne Paul – Flo
- Anna Karen – Maude
- Joan Sanderson – Mrs Harcourt

== Outline ==
This period sitcom, set in 1902, was a variation of The Rag Trade, which was also written by Chesney and Wolfe. Barbara Windsor, who also starred in The Rag Trade, played Millie, a cockney woman who led the women in a milliner's shop. The storylines focused around the conflict between the female workers and the management, Mr Harcourt and his apprentice Albert. Reflecting the mood of Britain in the late 1960s, the women adopted a new feisty spirit not seen in most characters in The Rag Trade. In the pilot the women were shown as strong supporters of the suffragette movement, but it was decided not to make much of this in the series.

The series failed to attract the same popularity as The Rag Trade, and was decommissioned after the first series. Only episode 3 still exists.

== Episodes ==
=== Comedy Playhouse Pilot (1968) ===
- Pilot (24 May 1968)

=== Series One (1969) ===
- Episode One (6 January 1969)
- Episode Two (13 January 1969)
- Episode Three (20 January 1969)
- Episode Four (27 January 1969)
- Episode Five (3 February 1969)
- Episode Six (10 February 1969)
