= Your Obedient Servant (Upstairs, Downstairs) =

- Upstairs, Downstairs episode
- Episode no.: Season 2 Episode 7
- Directed by: Derek Bennett
- Written by: Fay Weldon
- Original air date: 1 December 1972

Guest appearances
- Angela Walker (Violet); Larry Martyn (the Electrician); John Nettleton (Arthur Bellamy); John Crocker (the Shop/Dresshire Assistant); Marcia Ashton (Maudie Hudson); Andrew Downie (Donald Hudson); Kim Hardy (Alice Hudson)

Episode chronology
| ← Previous "The Property of a Lady" | Next → "Out of the Everywhere" |

"Your Obedient Servant" is the seventh episode of the second series of the British television series, Upstairs, Downstairs. The episode is set in 1909.

"Your Obedient Servant" was among the episodes omitted from Upstairs, Downstairs' initial Masterpiece Theatre broadcast in 1974, and was consequently not shown on US television until 1989.

== Plot ==
Richard has an older brother named Arthur (John Nettleton), who bullied Richard as a child. In 1909 Arthur visits Richard; the two have a falling out and they never speak to each other again. Donald Hudson, Mr. Hudson's brother, comes to Eaton Place with his wife (Maudie) and daughter (Alice). Donald is a relatively famous engineer, having constructed two major bridges over the Zambezi River; it appears that Hudson has gone to some effort to assist his brother's education in the past. Hudson wants to impress his brother and parades around London dressed as a toff. But the fraternal relationship remains very complicated.

== Cast ==
- Angela Walker (Violet)
- Larry Martyn (the Electrician)
- John Nettleton (Arthur Bellamy)
- John Crocker (the Shop/Dresshire Assistant)
- Marcia Ashton (Maudie Hudson)
- Andrew Downie (Donald Hudson)
- Kim Hardy (Alice Hudson)
