= Ryan Vasquez =

Venezuelan singer-songwriter

Background information
- Born: Gregorio Rafael Vasquez Azacon; September 20, 1993 (age 33); Barcelona, Anzoátegui, Venezuela
- Origin: Humaitá, Amazonas, Brazil
- Genres: Reggaeton, Latin pop, Latin urban
- Occupations: Singer, songwriter
- Instrument: Vocals
- Years active: 2009–present
- Label: Independent

Gregorio Rafael Vasquez Azacon (born 20 September 1993), known professionally as Ryan Vasquez, is a Venezuelan singer-songwriter based in Brazil.

He performs primarily reggaeton and Latin pop, recording music in both Spanish and Portuguese. After moving to Brazil in 2016, he established his music career in Amazonas, where he has released independent recordings and collaborated with Brazilian artists.

== Early life ==
He was born in Barcelona, Anzoátegui, Venezuela. He began recording music independently before relocating to Brazil in 2016.

== Career ==
After settling in Humaitá, Amazonas, continued his career as an independent artist. His music combines reggaeton with Brazilian urban influences.

In 2024, he became a representative of the Popular Music sector on the Municipal Council for Cultural Policies of Humaitá.
