= Your Obedient Servant (song) =

Song by Leslie Odom Jr. and Lin-Manuel Miranda

from the album Hamilton
- Released: 2015
- Genre: Show tune
- Length: 2:31
- Songwriter: Lin-Manuel Miranda

Audio
- "Your Obedient Servant" on YouTube

"Your Obedient Servant" is the twentieth song from Act 2 of the musical Hamilton, based on the life of Alexander Hamilton, which premiered on Broadway in 2015. Lin-Manuel Miranda wrote both the music and lyrics to the song. The song is sung by the characters of Hamilton and Aaron Burr, originally performed by Miranda and Leslie Odom Jr., respectively.

== Synopsis ==
The song is based on Hamilton and Burr's correspondence prior to their duel. The song takes its name from the closing in the letters "Your Obdt. St" (that is, "Your Obedient Servant", a common phrase used in correspondence at the time). The closing is a juxtaposition to the tone of the letters, which is reflected in the music as well as the lyrics.

=== Historical differences ===
Although Hamilton is based on true events, Miranda does use some dramatic license in retelling the story. In the case of the song "Your Obedient Servant" the main differences are:

- While Hamilton did favor Thomas Jefferson over Aaron Burr during the United States presidential election of 1800, using his connections and influence despite his personal retirement from active political offices and convincing some Federalist delegates to switch vote after the initial tie between the two Democratic-Republican candidates, no dispute ensued between Burr and Hamilton at the time and Burr became Vice President.
- Four years later in 1804, when Jefferson dropped Burr from his ticket for Vice President, Burr ran for Governor of New York and lost to little-known Morgan Lewis. Alexander Hamilton again played a part in opposing Burr. In April 1804, the Albany Register published a letter from Dr. Charles D. Cooper to Philip Schuyler, which relayed Hamilton's judgment that Burr was "a dangerous man, and one who ought not be trusted with the reins of government,” and claiming to know of "a still more despicable opinion which General Hamilton has expressed of Mr. Burr.” In June, Burr sent a first letter to Hamilton, seeking an affirmation or disavowal of Cooper's characterization of Hamilton's remarks.

Hamilton replied that Burr should give specifics of Hamilton's remarks, not Cooper's. He said he could not answer regarding Cooper's interpretation. A few more letters followed, in which the exchange escalated to Burr's demanding that Hamilton recant or deny any statement disparaging Burr's honor over the past 15 years. Hamilton did not. Burr responded by challenging Hamilton to a duel, personal combat under the formalized rules for dueling, the code duello.

== Analysis ==
The Huffington Post likens the song to other battle duets, such as "The Confrontation" from Les Misérables and Wicked's "What Is This Feeling?". Vibe calls the song an ironic depiction of the correspondence, set from Burr's point of view.

== Popular culture ==
- A line from the song, "Here's an itemized list of 30 years of disagreements", is an homage to Leslie Knope from Parks & Recreation.
