= Will There Ever Be Another You =

2025 novel by Patricia Lockwood

- Author: Patricia Lockwood
- Audio read by: Patricia Lockwood
- Language: English
- Genre: Literary fiction
- Set in: 21st-century America
- Publisher: Riverhead Books (US); Bloomsbury Circus (UK)
- Publication date: September 23, 2025 (US, UK)
- Publication place: United States; United Kingdom
- Pages: 256 pp
- ISBN: 9780593718551

Will There Ever Be Another You is the second novel by American poet Patricia Lockwood, published in 2025. It was released in the United States by Riverhead and in the United Kingdom by Bloomsbury. The book follows a writer whose life, relationships, and work are upended when she develops a chronic illness. It won the 2026 Gabe Hudson Prize from McSweeney's and a Georgia Author of the Year Award.

== Overview ==
The novel begins in Scotland, with the same cast of characters as Lockwood's first novel, No One Is Talking About This, and picking up where that narrative left off. The protagonist's sister has recently lost an infant, and the family is still processing its grief. Soon after, however, the storyline abruptly disintegrates when the protagonist develops a debilitating illness and her sensations, feelings, and ideas become unreliable and take primacy over events. What follows is a broad exploration of the self, family, illness, caregiving, art, creativity, and the structure of thought, told through various forms including fiction, memoir, essays, diaries, travelogues, lectures, and even literary criticism. These sections are haunted by phantoms and characters from popular culture and Lockwood's other works, including her previous novel; her memoir, Priestdaddy; adaptations of those books for TV, screen, and stage; and aspects of the author's life revealed through her writing for the London Review of Books and earlier profiles and interviews.

The book, which incorporates postmodern, surreal, and maximalist elements, takes its title from a 1997 issue of TIME magazine featuring Dolly, the cloned sheep, and anecdotes of duplication and replication run throughout.

== Reception ==
Upon publication, the novel received positive reviews from critics. In the New York Times, Dwight Garner praised the work's "weight and charm", rating it "a mixed success" and later including it among his books of the year. For the Washington Post, which lauded the book as "reliably brilliant," Maddie Crum wrote: "More so than an arc, the book takes the form of bright coruscations, shedding light on a few questions." In Slate, Laura Miller heralded "chapters jungly with bewildering language that occasionally open out into exhilarating clearings" and said Will There Ever Be Another You was "considerably more challenging than (Lockwood's) other books."

"Lockwood is a writer’s writer, and Will There Ever Be Another You is a bookish book, a magnificent feat of reading," wrote Frances Wilson for The New York Review of Books. "Lockwood’s real doppelgänger is the Scottish novelist Muriel Spark, who also wrote about doubles. Spark believed in a sixth, 'literary,' sense that allows certain readers and writers to see inside words as though they were looking at an X-ray, and Lockwood herself has this sense."

Some critics found the book's structure and plot confusing and took issue with its billing as a novel. "The result is cortical shrapnel – you can almost hear this book rattle when you open it," wrote Beejay Silcox for The Guardian. In the Wall Street Journal, Sam Sacks said the book's "flourishes can be a bit wooly, but they introduce a strangely slanted and alluringly palpable form of perception."

The New Yorker, which placed the novel among its best books of the year, observed that "the disease swiftly robs (the protagonist) of the ability to read, speak, or write coherently, and its warped imprint on her inner life becomes not just the subject but the form of the novel." Writing for the New Statesman, Joseph Williams concluded: "Will There Ever Be Another You has confirmed Lockwood's place as a major contemporary writer: here is the poetic insight of Anne Carson, the intellectual curiosity of Ben Lerner, and the cloacal humor of Patricia Lockwood."

"Will There Ever Be Another You defies conventions, roaming geographically and psychologically," said judge Alan Grostephan, in his citation for its Georgia Author of the Year Award. "It is a weird and incisive fever dream of a novel about illness, obsession, metalworking, fairies, a cat that changes colors after eating a skink, a husband with an incurable hole in his belly, a messed-up family, all filtered through the consciousness of a smart, unstable, and perceptive narrator."

Jeopardy! host Ken Jennings ranked the novel as his favorite book of 2025, calling it "like a miracle every page."

== Awards ==
Year	Award	Category	Result	Ref.
2026	Will There Ever Be Another You	Gabe Hudson Prize	—	Won
2026	Will There Ever Be Another You	Georgia Author of the Year Award	Literary Fiction	Won
2026	Will There Ever Be Another You	Joyce Carol Oates Literary Prize	—	Longlisted
