= Savannah Book Festival =

Literary festival held in Savannah, Georgia

The Savannah Book Festival is a literary festival held each February in Savannah, Georgia. The Savannah Book Festival is a four-day event with a ticketed opening address on Thursday evening, a ticketed keynote address on Friday evening, a full day of free author talks on Festival Saturday, and a ticketed closing address on Sunday afternoon.

The four-day Savannah Book Festival centers around three main components: three ticketed Headliner Events, Free Festival Saturday, and the renowned SBF@Schools program. The Savannah Book Festival brings authors and readers together to celebrate the written word, cultivate the joy of reading, and foster civil conversation.

It features authors as well as educational events. In the past, the festival has hosted best-selling authors Stephen King, James Patterson and David Baldacci, Pulitzer Prize winners Garry Wills, Geraldine Brooks and Isabel Wilkerson, National Book Award winner Ben Fountain, and Nobel Prize laureate Al Gore.

== 2027 Festival ==
The Twentieth Annual Savannah Book Festival will be Feb. 4-7, 2027 in various auditoriums surrounding the Telfair, Wright, and Chippewa Squares, and at the Savannah Theatre in Savannah.

== 2026 Festival ==
The Nineteenth Annual Savannah Book Festival was Feb. 6-9, 2026 in various auditoriums surrounding the Telfair, Wright, and Chippewa Squares, and at the Savannah Theatre in Savannah. Opening speaker was Sean Dietrich who kicked off festivities on Thurs, Feb. 6, 2026. On. Feb. 7, 2026, New York Times Bestselling author Brad Thor and USA Today Bestselling author Ward Larsen delivered a joint keynote address. On Feb. 9, 2026, Leigh Bardugo delivered the closing address.

- Journalist, anthropologist, and author Brian Goldstone
- New York Times Bestselling author Jeanine Cummins
- Stand-up comedian, television writer, and author Chris Duffy
- Chinese American poet and author Ha Jin
- Pulitzer prize winner and American novelist Jane Smiley
- English author, journalist, and children's book author Lindsey Kelk

== 2025 Festival ==
The Eighteenth Annual Savannah Book Festival was Feb. 6-9, 2025 in various auditoriums surrounding the Telfair, Wright, and Chippewa Squares, and at the Savannah Theatre in Savannah. Opening speaker was Anna Quindlen who kicked off festivities on Thurs, Feb. 6, 2025. On. Feb. 7, 2025, American journalist, author, and filmmaker Sebastian Junger delivered the keynote address. On Feb. 9, 2025, Ben Mezrich delivered the closing address.

- New York Times Bestselling author Claire Lombardo
- Pulitzer prize finalist and American science writer Dava Sobel
- Sunday Times and New York Times Bestselling author Peter Swanson
- American writer, actor, and humorist Sloane Crosley
- Professor and author Rob Lalka
- American novelist, screenwriter, and producer Liz Moore
- Entertainment Weekly critic, editor, and author Chris Nashawaty

== 2024 Festival ==
The Seventeenth Annual Savannah Book Festival was Feb. 15-18, 2024 in various auditoriums surrounding the Telfair, Wright, and Chippewa Squares, and at the Savannah Theatre in Savannah. Opening speaker was Ruth Ware who kicked off festivities on Thurs, Feb. 15, 2024. On. Feb. 16, 2024, American author and journalist Jeannette White delivered the keynote address. On Feb. 18, 2024, David Grann delivered the closing address.

- Acclaimed author, journalist, and editor John Berendt
- Best selling author Harrison Scott Key
- American poet, essayist, and professor Ross Gay
- American novelist and short story author Jayne Anne Phillips
- Fantasy and romance fiction author TJ Klune
- Journalist and memoirist Michael Finkel

== 2023 Festival ==
- The Sixteenth Annual Savannah Book Festival was Feb. 16-19, 2023 in various auditoriums surrounding the Telfair, Wright, and Chippewa Squares, and at the Savannah Theatre in Savannah. Opening speaker was George Dawes Green who kicked off festivities on Thurs, Feb. 16, 2023. On. Feb. 17, 2023, American authors and journalists Douglas Preston and Lincoln Child delivered a joint keynote address. On Feb. 19, 2023, David Maraniss delivered the closing address.
- Former Award winning television reporter and anchor Gayle Jessup White
- Research fellow and author Alexandra Horowitz
- New York Times Bestselling author Stacy Willingham
- American travel author Patricia Schutlz
- National poverty and child welfare advocate David Ambroz
- American author and freelance contributor of the New Yorker Dani Shapiro
- New York Times Best selling author and illustrator David Yoon

== 2022 Festival ==
The Fifteenth Annual Savannah Book Festival was Feb. 16-19, 2022 in various auditoriums surrounding the Telfair, Wright, and Chippewa Squares, and at the Savannah Theatre in Savannah. Opening speaker was David Baldacci who kicked off festivities on Thurs, Feb. 17, 2022. On. Feb. 18, 2022, American author, crime novelist, and Edgar Award winner William Kent Krueger delivered the keynote address. On Feb. 20, 2022, a group of authors delivered a closing address.

- Comedian and author Michael Ian Black
- Poet, author, and journalist Gabriela Garcia
- Poet, novelist, and essayist Patricia Lockwood
- Pulitzer prize winning journalist and author Glenn Frankel
- American novelist Kristen Harmel

== 2020 Festival ==
The Thirteenth Annual Savannah Book Festival was Feb. 13-16, 2020 in various auditoriums surrounding the Telfair, Wright, and Chippewa Squares, and at the Savannah Theatre in Savannah. Opening speaker was Joseph Kanon who kicked off festivities on Thurs, Feb. 13, 2020. On. Feb. 14, 2020, American author, lawyer, and former politician John Grisham delivered the keynote address. On Feb. 16, 2020, John Becker and Megan Scott delivered a joint closing address.

- American author, columnist, and humorist Bruce Cameron
- Italian-American Best selling author Andre Aciman
- American author Jeanine Cummins
- Orange Prize winner and author Tea Obreht
- Best selling author John McMahon

== 2019 Festival ==
The Twelfth Annual Savannah Book Festival was Feb. 14-17, 2019 in various auditoriums surrounding the Telfair, Wright, and Chippewa Squares, and at the Savannah Theatre in Savannah. Opening speakers were George Saunders and Paula Saunders, who kicked off the festivities on Thurs, Feb. 14, 2019. On Feb. 15, 2019, American political analyst and author Chris Stirewalt delivered the keynote address. On Feb. 17, 2019, Lynn Vincent and Sara Vladic delivered a joint closing address.

- American author, zoologist, and conservationist Delia Owens
- Best selling author Harrison Scott Key
- Best selling author Larry Loftis
- Professor of linguistics and American author Deborah Tannen
- Colombian author Ingrid Rojas Contreras
- Best selling author Patti Callahan Henry
- Journalist, musician, and author Jonathan Miles
- New York Times Best selling author and lawyer Marie Benedict

== 2018 Festival ==
The Eleventh Annual Savannah Book Festival was Feb. 15-18, 2018 in various auditoriums surrounding the Telfair, Wright, and Chippewa Squares, and at the Trustees Theater in Savannah. Opening speaker, Diana Gabaldon, kicked off the festivities on Thurs, Feb. 15, 2018. On Feb. 16, 2018, renowned author Lisa Ko delivered the keynote address. On Feb. 18, 2018, American Author of 30 plus novels, Jodi Picoult delivered the closing address.

- Major Gen (Ret.) Robert Latiff
- American lawyer Floyd Abrams
- Poet, novelist, and essayist Patricia Lockwood
- New York Times Best selling author Karen Robards
- Journalist and author Douglas Preston
- Sports Illustrated contributer and New York Times Best selling author Brian Curtis
- President and co-founder of Savannah College of Art and Design Paula Wallace
- Deputy Investigations editor of the New York Times and author David Enrich
- New York Times Best selling author Chloe Benjamin
- International Best selling author Tayari Jones

== 2017 Festival ==
The Tenth Annual Savannah Book Festival was Feb. 16-19, 2017 in Telfair, Wright, and Chippewa Squares and at the Trustees Theater in Savannah. Opening speaker, James Patterson, kicked off the festivities with his welcome address. On Feb. 17, 2017, Pulitzer Prize Winning Author Colson Whitehead delivered the keynote address. On Feb. 19, 2017, New York Times Bestselling Author Christina Baker Kline delivered the closing address.

Other 2017 authors include:

- Former EIC of ESPN and author Gary Belsky
- New York Times journalist Frank Bruni
- Retired U.S. foreign service officer and historian Peter Cozzens
- New York Times Best selling author Megan Miranda

== 2016 Festival ==
The Ninth Annual Savannah Book Festival was Feb. 11.-14, 2016 in Telfair, Wright, and Chippewa Squares and at the Trustees Theater in Savannah. Opening speaker, Paula McLain, kicked off the festivities with her welcome address. On Feb. 12, 2016, american journalist and author Erik Larson delivered the keynote address. On Feb. 14, 2016, New York Times Bestselling Author William Paul Young delivered the closing address.

== 2015 Festival ==
The Eighth Annual Savannah Book Festival was Feb. 12-15, 2015 in Telfair, Wright, and Chippewa Squares and at the Trustees Theater in Savannah. Opening speaker, Janet Evanovich, kicked off the festivities with her welcome address. On Feb. 13, 2015, political satirist and journalist P.J. O'Rourke delivered the keynote address. On Feb. 15, 2015, renowned gothic literary icon Anne Rice and her son, thriller novelist, Christopher Rice, delivered a joint closing address.

Other 2015 authors included:

- American stand-up comedian, actor, and author Patton Oswalt
- Attorney and former White House counsel John Dean
- New York Times Best selling novelist Abbott Kahler
- ABC News correspondent and author Lynn Sherr

== 2014 Festival ==
The Seventh Annual Savannah Book Festival was Feb. 13-16, 2014 in Telfair Square and at the Trustees Theater in Savannah. Opening speaker, Scott Turow, kicked off the festivities with his welcome address. On Feb. 14, 2014, best-selling author Mitch Albom delivered the keynote address. On Feb. 16, 2014, the closing address was given by Dr. Eben Alexander.

Other 2014 authors included:

- Pulitzer Prize-winning biographer A. Scott Berg
- New York Times Best selling novelist Wiley Cash
- New York Times Best selling novelist and physician Robin Cook
- Chicago journalist and Best selling historical fiction novelist Nancy Horan
- New York Times Best selling novelist Lily Koppel
- New York Times Best selling novelist Wally Lamb
- CIA lawyer John Rizzo
- Travel writer and author Patricia Schultz
- O. Henry Prize Winner and author Anita Shreve
- Art critic and freelance contributor to the New York Times Deborah Solomon

== 2013 Festival ==
The Sixth Annual Savannah Book Festival was Feb. 14-17, 2013 in Telfair Square and at the Trustees Theater in Savannah. On Feb. 14, 2013, humorist Dave Barry delivered the welcome address. On Feb. 15, 2013, thriller writer James Patterson delivered the keynote address. On Feb. 17, 2013, political novelist David Baldacci delivered the closing address.

Other 2013 authors included:

- Nobel Prize winner and former vice president Al Gore
- NBC Today co-host Hoda Kotb
- Diary of a Wimpy Kid series author Jeff Kinney
- Literary novelist T. C. Boyle
- Literary novelist and National Book Award winner Ben Fountain
- Presidential historian Evan Thomas
- Pulitzer Prize-winning historian and religion writer Garry Wills
- Pulitzer Prize-winning journalist and historian Isabel Wilkerson
- Pulitzer Prize-winning journalist and novelist J. R. Moehringer
- CNN anchor and chief Washington correspondent Jake Tapper

== 2012 Festival ==
Publishers Weekly, the publishing industry's leading trade magazine, noted that the Savannah Book Festival "is carving a space for itself among the book festival big leagues."

The 2012 author lineup included:

- Best-selling thriller writer Stephen King
- Literary novelist Pat Conroy
- Steve Jobs biographer Walter Isaacson
- Political thriller writer Brad Thor
- James Bond series writer Jeffery Deaver
- Pulitzer Prize-winning literary novelist Geraldine Brooks
- Literary novelist Stewart O'Nan'

== 2011 Festival ==
The 2011 author lineup included:

- Political strategist Karl Rove
- Literary novelist Lee Smith
- Literary novelist Karl Marlantes
