= Can't We Talk About Something More Pleasant? =

2014 graphic novel

- Author: Roz Chast
- Language: English
- Genre: Memoir
- Publisher: Bloomsbury
- Publication date: 2014
- Publication place: United States
- Pages: 228
- ISBN: 978-1-60819-806-1

Can't We Talk About Something More Pleasant? is a 2014 graphic memoir by American cartoonist and author Roz Chast. The book is about Chast's relationship with parents in their final years. Her father, George, who worked as a language teacher, died at the age of 95 and her mother, Elizabeth, who was an assistant elementary school principal, died at the age of 97. The author derived the book's title from her parents' refusal to discuss their advancing years and infirmities. Chast's cartoons have appeared in The New Yorker magazine since 1978. The book was appreciated for showcasing Chast's talent as cartoonist and storyteller. It received several awards and was a number 1 New York Times Bestseller.

== Plot ==
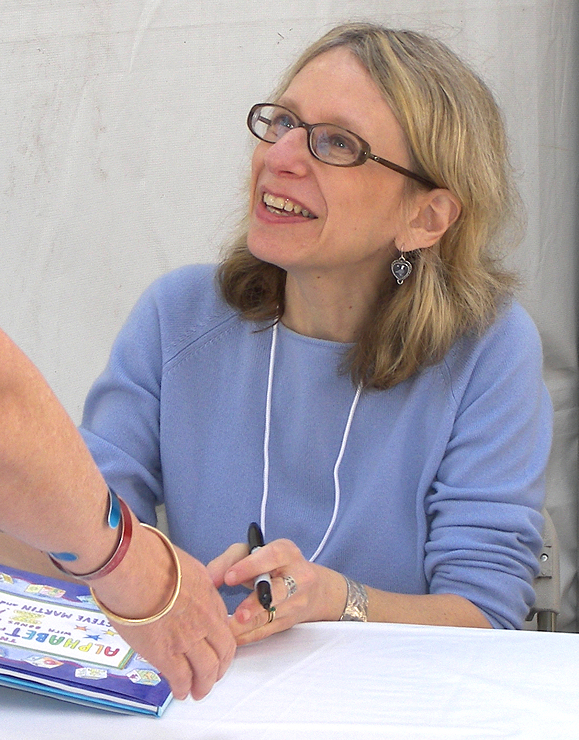
Author Roz Chast at the 2007 Texas Book Festival

The book's storyline, spanning an eight-year period from 2001 to 2009, concerns Roz Chast's parents living in Brooklyn. The book describes various interactions between Chast and her parents. Chast, who lives in Connecticut, often used to visit her parents, calling their home "a hoarder's paradise". The couple is later moved into assisted living facilities near Chast's home due to their ailing health.

== Publication ==
The book is a memoir, illustrated with full-color comic pictures. It was published by Bloomsbury in 2014. The book is divided into eighteen chapters including introduction and epilogue. The book consists of multi-media presentation: cartoons accompanied by text in speech balloons with additional handwritten commentary, family photographs, reproductions of Chast's mother's poetry, and "a series of twelve largely wordless" drawings in her last days. In addition to the United States, it was also made available in various other countries such as Australia, Canada, Germany, Hong Kong, Netherlands, New Zealand, Oman, Singapore, South Africa, Thailand, and the United Kingdom.

== Review and reception ==
Alex Witchelmay of The New York Times described the book as "beautiful, deeply felt" and "scorchingly honest". Rachel Cooke wrote in The Guardian that the book is "honest, plangent and thoroughly ghoulish. But it's also hysterical". The editorial cartoonist of The Boston Globe, Dan Wasserman, reviewed the book, calling it "a touching, unflinching, darkly hilarious account" which "serves as a strange sort of self-help guide for those stumbling through the last years of their parents' lives". Tahneer Oksman of the Jewish Book Council wrote that Chast "incorporates her familiarly whimsical humor alongside prose-heavy pages detailing the grief and guilt". Felice Aull, Adjunct Associate Professor at New York University School of Medicine, described "The Wheel of Doom" as "one of the most ambitious renderings". Paul Gravett of The Independent appreciated the book for tackling "a dark, tricky subject" and called it "a new direction for the graphic novel with a reflection on the sad, inevitable end".

== Awards ==
In 2014, the book won the National Book Critics Circle Award in the Autobiography/Memoir section. The book also won the inaugural Kirkus Prize in non-fiction category presented by Kirkus Reviews in 2014 which has a cash remuneration of $50,000. Kirkus described the book as "a top-notch graphic memoir that adds a whole new dimension to readers' appreciation of Chast and her work". The book was a finalist for the Thurber Prize for American Humor but lost to Dear Committee Members by Julie Schumacher. The book was selected as one of The New York Times Book Review's 10 Best Books of 2014.
