= Lawrence R. Jacobs =

American political scientist and professor

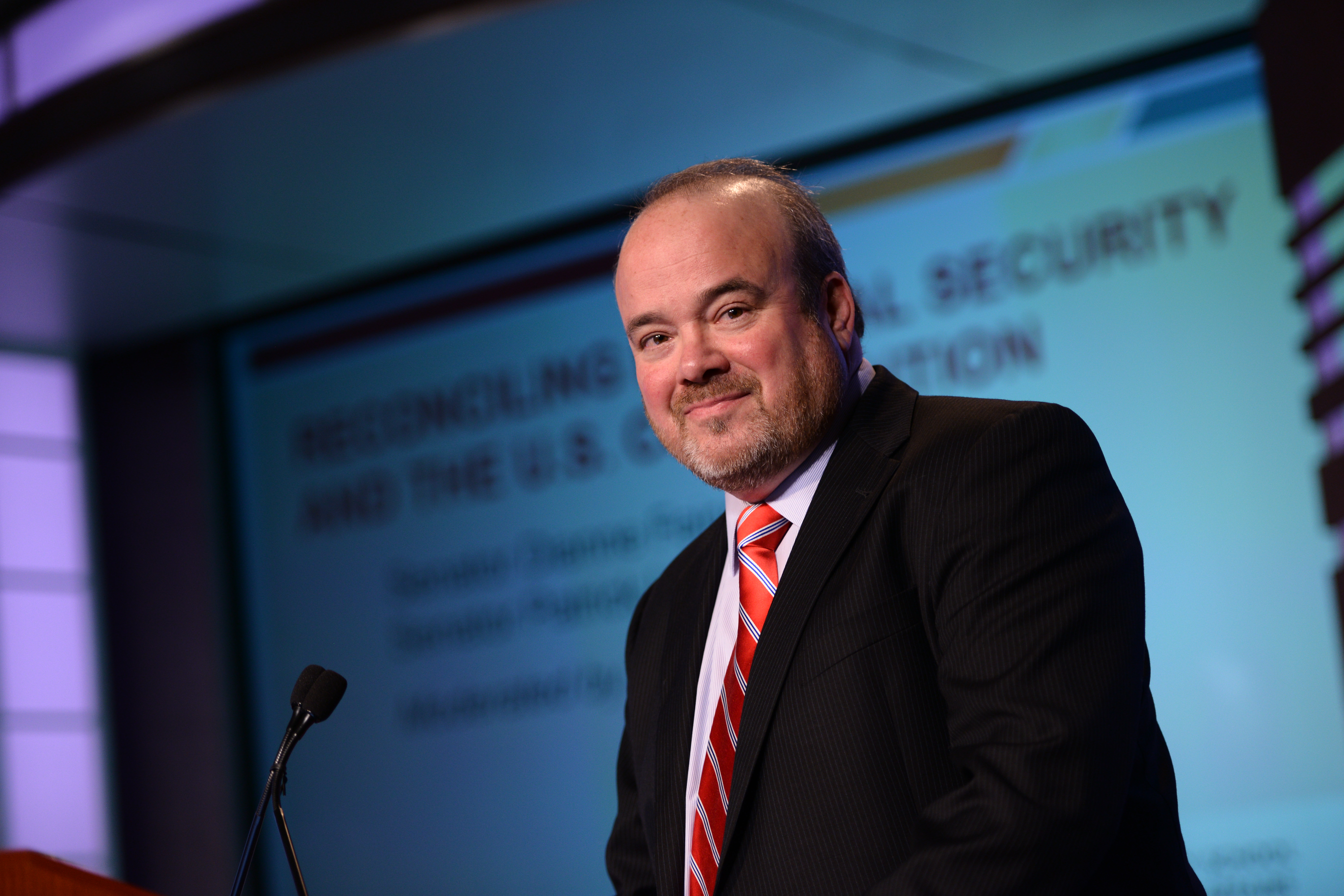
- Jacobs in 2015
- Born: March 6, 1959 (age 67); New York City
- Spouse: Julie Schumacher
- Children: 2

Academic background
- Education: Oberlin College (B.A.); Columbia University (Ph.D.)

Academic work
- Discipline: Political science
- Institutions: Humphrey School of Public Affairs at University of Minnesota; Visiting Fellow, All Souls College, Oxford University, 2019-2020; Associate Member, Nuffield College, Oxford University, 2013; Fellow, American Academy of Arts and Sciences
- Notable works: Against All Odds; Politicians Don’t Pander; Talking Together; Fed Power

Lawrence R. Jacobs (born March 6, 1959) is an American political scientist and founder and director of the Center for the Study of Politics and Governance (CSPG) at the University of Minnesota. He was appointed the Walter F. and Joan Mondale Chair for Political Studies at the University of Minnesota's Humphrey School of Public Affairs in 2005 and holds the McKnight Presidential Chair. Jacobs has written or edited, alone or collaboratively, 19 books and over 100 scholarly articles in addition to numerous reports and media essays on American democracy, national and Minnesota elections, political communications, health care reform, and economic inequality. His latest books are Against All Odds: How Health Reform Endures and Democracy Under Fire: Donald Trump and the Breaking of American History. In 2020, he was elected a Fellow of the American Academy of Arts and Sciences.

== Early life ==
Jacobs was born in Brooklyn, New York and raised in Croton-on-Hudson, New York. His father, Henry Jacobs, served in the U.S. Army and worked in New York City as a stenographer, opening his own firm. His mother, Judy Jacobs, was a registered nurse.

Jacobs graduated from Oberlin College in 1981 with a B.A. in History and English and received his Ph.D. from Columbia University in political science in 1990.

== Career as researcher ==
Recurring topics in Jacobs' research include American democracy, health care reform, political communications, and central banking.

=== American democracy ===
Jacobs' first book, The Health of Nations, and related studies identified the political and institutional conditions that explain why two broadly similar countries – the U.S. and Britain – designed dramatically different health programs, the National Health Service in 1946 and the Medicare Act of 1965. He used American and British archival evidence to demonstrate that the preferences of citizens along with the organization of interest groups and the administrative capacity of government institutions were critical factors in accounting for the cross-national differences.

Jacobs's 2000 book Politicians Don’t Pander (co-authored with Robert Y. Shapiro) looked at how changes in contemporary American politics and, especially, political parties altered the conditions that had facilitated some level of government responsiveness prior to the 1970s; the result is a more insular policy-making process that is less responsive to the preferences of most citizens. The book demonstrates that the motivations of politicians during the 1980s and 1990s shifted from responding to majority opinion to crafting the words, arguments, and symbols to change public opinion to support the policies political elites and their allies and donors favored. Politicians Don’t Pander received awards from the American Political Science Association, the American Sociological Association, and the John F. Kennedy School of Government at Harvard University.

Jacobs extended his analysis of elite efforts at manipulation with James N. Druckman in the 2015 book Who Governs? Presidents, Public Opinion, and Manipulation. Citing polls and other evidence from presidential archives, they reported that presidents starting with Lyndon Johnson used their private research on public opinion to design arguments and personal images to build personal popularity and win elections in order to defy the policy preferences of most Americans.

Jacobs's investigation of the sources of U.S. international economic and foreign policy confirmed the pattern of government unresponsiveness to the policy preferences of most Americans. In a 2005 study with Benjamin Page published in American Political Science Review, Jacobs' statistical analyses found that the views of business executives (rather than public opinion and policy experts) drove the policy of senior U.S. government officials.

The political polarization of elites is a defining feature of American politics that Jacobs has investigated. His 2009 book Class War? What Americans Really Think about Economic Inequality (with Benjamin Page) examines decades of public-opinion surveys, as well as their own comprehensive Inequality Survey, to make the case that the wide divides among politicians diverge from the attitudes of most Americans who both support government programs to create opportunity that levels the playing field and harbor the conservative values of individualism and self-reliance.

Jacobs' 2024 book Democracy Under Fire is an historical account of the rise of insurgents in American politics, exemplified by the outsider candidacy of Donald Trump. In the book, Jacobs examines how political reforms over the past 250 years ceded power over who is nominated to run for elected office to small cliques of ideologically-motivated party activists, interest groups, and donors. He writes that Trump's rise is not an aberration but a predictable outcome of trends deeply rooted in American history which accelerated in the last few decades. Jacobs points to reforms which could restrain the ambition of politicians who thrive on division and spur broad citizen engagement with tangible policy making.

=== Health care reform ===
Jacobs has published books on the passage of Medicare in 1965 and the failure of Bill Clinton’s effort at health reform in 1993-94 as well as the enactment of the Affordable Care Act in 2010 and its survival in the face of determined opposition. His 2015 book on the Affordable Care Act, Health Care Reform and American Politics: What Everyone Needs to Know, co-written with Theda Skocpol, is in its third printing.

Jacobs has used the ferocious battles over the Affordable Care Act (ACA) to examine opportunities to mitigate America’s seemingly insurmountable partisan divide. His 2026 book Against All Odds: How Health Reform Endures (with Ling Zhu and Suzanne Mettler) explains the ACA’s improbable survival from near defeats. The book traces the ACA’s journey from the aggressive efforts at repeal to the eventual decision of congressional Republicans to accept many of its core programs and regulations even as they sharply reduced spending in some areas.

His article "Policy Threat, Partisanship, and the Case of the Affordable Care Act" (with Suzanne Mettler and Ling Zhu) unpacks a startling development: The ACA’s passage and implementation changed public opinion toward supporting the law including among Republicans.

=== Central banks ===
One of Jacobs' recent areas of research is the political dynamic of central banks that prevent them from acting as neutral servants of the "public good." His book Fed Power: How Finance Wins (with Desmond King) is an investigation of the Federal Reserve Bank’s bias toward finance in its response to the 2008 financial crisis. Fed Power was updated in its second edition to include the Biden administration. More recently, Jacobs and King convened an international team of researchers to investigate the variations across western countries in how central banks regulate risk, manage access to capital, and respond to the inequality generated by their policies. Picking Winners: Citizenship, Central Banks, and Consumer Finance (2026) demonstrates that central banks and financial regulators are often swayed by deeply resourced financial interests, the values and perspectives of capital over those of wage earners, and institutional designs that are biased to favor those with greater capital and income.

=== Political communications ===
Jacobs' book Talking Together: Public Deliberation in America and the Search for Community (co-authored with Fay Lomax Cook and Michael X. Delli Carpini) presents the first national empirical study of how Americans attempted to persuade each other about matters of politics or met in formally organized deliberative forums to discuss community concerns. The research in Talking Together indicated that more than one out of four Americans join organized deliberations – on par with more traditional forms of political engagement such as contacting a government official or attempting to persuade someone to vote for a favored candidate.

Jacobs is a longstanding co-editor of the University of Chicago Press series in American politics.

His research has received a number of awards as well as grants from, among others, the National Science Foundation, Ford Foundation, Pew Charitable Trusts, Robert Wood Johnson Foundation, and the McKnight Foundation.

== Career as public intellectual ==
Jacobs is a leading public intellectual, offering non-partisan commentary and programming on American politics and government policy. In 2005, Jacobs founded the Center for the Study of Politics and Governance (CSPG) at the University of Minnesota's Humphrey School of Public Affairs. Under his direction, it has become an innovator of research and initiatives to strengthen democratic institutions and civic engagement, with a mission to foster conversations and collaborations across the differences that scar politics in Minnesota and America.

Professor Jacobs developed the Certificate in Election Administration, which is the country’s largest program to offer non-partisan professional training in election administration. The program now offers 10 courses and a webinar spotlighting pressing challenges facing election administrators.

He also runs an iconic leadership development program called the Policy Fellows, which has supported Minnesota's civic culture for 35 years. Its alumni include U.S. Senator Amy Klobuchar, former U.S. Senator Norm Coleman and many other prominent leaders in government, business, and non-profits.

In addition, CSPG established the "Dialogue Across Difference" series to host dozens of public conversations on state and national politics and public policy. Guests include prominent scholars and public figures including Tom Friedman, Henry Kissinger, Amy Klobuchar, and Nancy Pelosi. More than 100,000 viewers have attended these programs online in addition to the in-person attendees.

Jacobs established the “Conservative Voices” series with Vin Weber to broaden intellectual diversity on campus by including prominent conservative thinkers and policy makers. Guests have included Ramesh Ponnuru (Senior Editor, National Review), Robert Doar (President, American Enterprise Institute), Stephen Hadley (National Security Advisor, George W. Bush), and Stephen Moore (FOX economic commentator and Club for Growth founder).

Jacobs has been widely recognized for his non-partisan work with CSPG, the media, and civic organizations. The Minneapolis University Rotary Club awarded Jacobs its “Citizen of the Year Award” in 2017. The University of Minnesota recognized his community engagement with its “Outstanding Community Service Award” in 2014.

In 2003, he chaired the American Political Science Association's Task Force on Inequality and American Democracy, the organization's first formal task force in half a century on the consequences of rising economic inequality for American democracy. The Task Force's report in 2005 spurred increased media attention, research, and teaching on the political effects of rising economic and racial disparities.

For nearly 15 years, Jacobs taught with former Vice President Walter Mondale at the Humphrey School. Their course concentrated on the U.S. Constitution and national security and tracked the pattern across Democratic and Republican administrations of growing presidential power since the Second World War.

== Personal life ==
Jacobs is married to Julie Schumacher, a Regents Professor of English at the University of Minnesota. She is also a novelist, recognized most notably for Dear Committee Members, for which she became the first woman to win the Thurber Prize for American Humor. She has also written 11 other novels as well as numerous short stories, which have been anthologized in the O. Henry Awards and The Best American Short Stories collections. Her most recent book is Patient, Female, a collection of her short stories. They met in an English class during their first year at Oberlin College.

They have two adult daughters, Emma Lillian Jacobs and Isabella Nan Jacobs.

== Selected publications ==
External videos
- Thomas Friedman, "America First, My Version", February 2026, Humphrey School of Public Affairs
- "Improving the Value of Medical Care", January 2026, Humphrey School of Public Affairs
- "A Conversation with Jake Sullivan", June 2025, Humphrey School of Public Affairs
- "Speaking Up with Pamela Paul", May 2025, Humphrey School of Public Affairs
- "Donald Trump's Economic Policy For Growth" with Stephen Moore, April 2025, Humphrey School of Public Affairs
- "The Fabric of Our Constitution" with Jack Goldsmith, April 2025, Humphrey School of Public Affairs
- "Today's Conservative Domestic Agenda" with Robert Doar, September 2024, Humphrey School of Public Affairs
- "Restoring Intellectual Diversity on University Campuses" with Ramesh Ponnuru, August 2023, Humphrey School of Public Affairs
- "A Conversation with Thomas Friedman", May 2023, Humphrey School of Public Affairs
- "Unfinished Business: Building Black Participation in America Depends on Building Black Wealth": Jacobs moderates a discussion with the president and CEO of Prosperity Now, Jan. 12, 2021, Center for the Study of Politics and Governance
- Opening remarks made by Jacobs and others for “Walter Mondale: Living Legacy,” Oct. 21, 2015, C-SPAN
- "Bipartisanship and Budget Agreement": Jacobs talks with former U.S. Reps. Gil Gutknecht and Martin Olav Sabo, Dec. 11, 2013, C-SPAN
- "Selling Domestic Policy": Jacobs leads a panel discussion with advisers from the Nixon through G.W. Bush administrations, June 13, 2009, C-SPAN
- "Role of the Vice President": Walter Mondale talks about the vice presidency and is interviewed by Jacobs, March 24, 2008], C-SPAN

=== Books ===
- Lawrence R. Jacobs, Ling Zhu, and Suzanne Mettler, Against All Odds: How Health Reform Endures (2026)
- Lawrence R. Jacobs and Desmond King (editors), Picking Winners: Citizenship, Central Banks, and Consumer Finance (2026)
- Lawrence R. Jacobs, Democracy Under Fire: Donald Trump and the Breaking of American History (2022 and 2024)
- Lawrence R. Jacobs and Desmond King, Fed Power: How Finance Wins (2016, second edition 2021)
- Lawrence Jacobs and Theda Skocpol, Health Care Reform and American Politics: What Everyone Needs to Know (2015)
- James N. Druckman and Lawrence R. Jacobs, Who Governs? Presidents, Public Opinion, and Manipulation (2015)
- Robert Y. Shapiro and Lawrence R. Jacobs, eds., The Oxford Handbook of American Public Opinion and the Media (2013)
- Lawrence R. Jacobs and Desmond King, eds., Obama at the Crossroads: Politics, Markets, and the Battle for America's Future (2012)
- Theda Skocpol and Lawrence R. Jacobs, eds., Reaching for a New Deal: Ambitious Governance, Economic Meltdown, and Polarized Politics in Obama's First Two Years (2011)
- Benjamin I. Page and Lawrence R. Jacobs, eds., Class War?: What Americans Really Think about Economic Inequality (2009)
- Lawrence D. Brown and Lawrence R. Jacobs, eds., The Private Abuse of the Public Interest: Market Myths and Policy Muddles (2009)
- Lawrence R. Jacobs and Desmond King, eds., The Unsustainable American State (2009)
- Lawrence R. Jacobs, Fay Lomax Cook, and Michael Delli Carpini, Talking Together: Public Deliberation in America and the Search for Community (2009)
- James A. Morone and Lawrence R. Jacobs, eds., Healthy, Wealthy, and Fair: Health Care and the Good Society (2005)
- Lawrence R. Jacobs and Theda Skocpol, eds., Inequality and American Democracy: What We Know and What We Need to Learn (2005)
- Lawrence R. Jacobs and Robert Y. Shapiro. Politicians Don't Pander: Political Manipulation and the Loss of Democratic Responsiveness (2000)
- Lawrence R. Jacobs, The Health of Nations: Public Opinion and the Making of American and British Health Policy (1993)

=== Journal articles ===
- Suzanne Mettler, Lawrence Jacobs, and Ling Zhu, "Policy Threat, Partisanship, and the Case of the Affordable Care Act." American Political Science Review (February 2023)
- Lawrence R. Jacobs, “The Recoil Effect: Public Opinion and Policymaking in the U.S. and Britain.” Comparative Politics (January 1992)
- Lawrence R. Jacobs, “Institutions and Culture: Health Policy and Public Opinion in the U.S. and Britain.” World Politics (January 1992)
- Lawrence R. Jacobs, "Health Reform Impasse: The Politics of American Ambivalence toward Government." Journal of Health Politics, Policy and Law (1993)
- Lawrence R. Jacobs, Robert Y. Shapiro, "Issues, Candidate Image, and Priming: The Use of Private Polls in Kennedy's 1960 Presidential Campaign." American Political Science Review (1994)
- Lawrence R. Jacobs, Robert Y. Shapiro, "The American Public’s Pragmatic Liberalism Meets Its Philosophical Conservativism." Journal of Health Politics, Policy and Law (1999)
- Lawrence R. Jacobs, Robert Y. Shapiro, "Lyndon Johnson, Vietnam, and Public Opinion: Rethinking Realist Theory of Leadership." Presidential Studies Quarterly (1999)
- Michael X. Delli Carpini, Fay Lomax Cook, and Lawrence R. Jacobs, “Public Deliberation, Discursive Participation, and Citizen Engagement: A Review of The Empirical Literature.” Annual Review of Political Science (2004)
- James N. Druckman, Lawrence R. Jacobs, Eric Ostermeier, "Candidate Strategies to Prime Issues and Image." The Journal of Politics (2004)
- Lawrence R. Jacobs and Benjamin I. Page, “Who Influences U.S. Foreign Policy?” American Political Science Review (February 2005)
- James N. Druckman, Lawrence R. Jacobs. "Lumpers and Splitters: The Public Opinion Information That Politicians Collect and Use." The Public Opinion Quarterly (2006)
- Joe Soss, Lawrence R. Jacobs, "The Place of Inequality: Non-participation in the American Polity." Political Science Quarterly (2009)
- Lawrence R. Jacobs, "Building Reliable Theories of the Presidency." Presidential Studies Quarterly (2009)
- Lawrence R. Jacobs and Desmond King, "Varieties of Obamaism: Structure, Agency, and the Obama Presidency." Perspectives on Politics (2010)
- Fay Lomax Cook, Lawrence R. Jacobs, and Dukhong Kim. "Trusting What You Know: Information, Knowledge, and Confidence in Social Security." The Journal of Politics (2010)
- Timothy Callaghan and Lawrence R. Jacobs, "Process Learning and the Implementation of Medicaid Reform." Publius: The Journal of Federalism (2014)
- Lawrence R. Jacobs, "Health Reform and the Future of American Politics." Perspectives on Politics (2014)
- Lawrence R. Jacobs, "The Contested Politics of Public Value." Public Administration Review (2014)
- Lawrence R Jacobs, Suzanne Mettler, and Ling Zhu, “Affordable Care Act Moving to New Stage of Public Acceptance.” Journal of Health Politics, Policy and Law (December 2019)
- Ling Zhu, Suzanne Mettler, and Lawrence Jacobs, "The Pathways of Policy Feedback: How Health Reform Influences Political Efficacy and Participation." Policy Studies Journal (2021)
- Lawrence Jacobs and Suzanne Mettler, "What Health Reform Tells Us About American Politics." Journal of Health Politics, Policy and Law (August 2020) (Most read JHPPL article published in 2020)

=== Op-eds ===
- Lawrence R. Jacobs, “Minnesota progressives should be leading the fight for accountability on fraud.” Star Tribune (April 2, 2026)
- Lawrence R. Jacobs, “Kaohly Her’s First 100 Days as St Paul Mayor.” St. Paul Pioneer Press (December 15, 2025)
- Lawrence R. Jacobs, “The costs of Trump defying the Supreme Court.” The Hill (September 20, 2025)
- Lawrence R. Jacobs, “Returning to Good Governance in Minnesota.” Star Tribune (January 6, 2025)
- Lawrence R. Jacobs, “Too much 'sunshine' could burn U.” Star Tribune (December 13, 2023)
- Lawrence R. Jacobs, “Instead of Boosting Democracy, Primary Elections are Undermining It.” Washington Post (April 27, 2022)
- Theda Skocpol and Lawrence R. Jacobs, “Keep it simple, Democrats.” USA Today (July 12, 2020)
- Lawrence R. Jacobs, Suzanne Mettler and Ling Zhu, “Republicans are relying on the Affordable Care Act to respond to the pandemic.” Washington Post (April 27, 2020)
- Lawrence Jacobs, “Minnesota's urban-rural divide is no lie.” Star Tribune (July 28, 2019)
- Lawrence Jacobs, “The cluelessness of the elites.” Star Tribune (March 9, 2019)
- Lawrence Jacobs, “Our political divide now extends even to (I'm not kidding) … poker.” Star Tribune (February 14, 2018)
- Lawrence Jacobs, “Republicans are radicalizing Democrats. Just look at healthcare.” The Guardian (September 13, 2017)
- Lawrence Jacobs, “Wake up and see the Trump card: He can win.” Star Tribune (May 23, 2016)
- Lawrence R. Jacobs and Joanne M. Miller, “Ranked-Choice Voting: By the Data, Still Flawed.” Star Tribune (February 13, 2014)
- Lawrence Jacobs, “Right vs. Left in the Midwest.” New York Times (November 23, 2013)
- Theda Skocpol and Lawrence Jacobs, “Bending Toward Universal Health Care.” New York Times (June 28, 2012)
- Lawrence R. Jacobs, “Third Party Guys, The Real Threat.” Washington Post (October 19, 2003)
