= Thurber Prize for American Humor =

Literary award

The Thurber Prize for American Humor, named after American humorist James Thurber, recognizes outstanding contributions in humor writing. The prize is given out by the Thurber House. It was first awarded irregularly, but since 2004 has been bestowed annually. In 2015, the finalists were for the first time, all women. Winners of the Thurber Prize have included authors from an array of diverse backgrounds, from The Daily Show hosts Jon Stewart and Trevor Noah to The New Yorker staff writers Calvin Trillin and Ian Frazier, as well as university professors Julie Schumacher and Harrison Scott Key.

== Honorees ==
Award winners and finalists
Year	Author	Title	Result	Ref.
1997	Ian Frazier	Coyote v. Acme	Winner	
1997	Al Franken	Rush Limbaugh Is a Big Fat Idiot and Other Observations	Finalist	
1997	David Sedaris	Naked	Finalist	
1999	The Onion editorial staff	Our Dumb Century	Winner	
2001	David Sedaris	Me Talk Pretty One Day	Winner	
2001	Henry Alford	Big Kiss	Special Honor	
2001	Andy Borowitz	The Trillionaire Next Door	Finalist	
2001	Bill Bryson	In a Sunburned Country	Finalist	
2001	Brett Leveridge	Men My Mother Dated	Finalist	
2001	Jim Mullen	It Takes a Village Idiot	Finalist	
2004	Christopher Buckley	No Way to Treat a First Lady	Winner	
2004	Robert Kaplow	Me and Orson Welles	Finalist	
2004	Dan Zevin	The Day I Turned Uncool	Finalist	
2005	Jon Stewart, Ben Karlin, David Javerbaum and The Daily Show writing staff	America (The Book)	Winner	
2005	Andy Borowitz	The Borowitz Report: The Big Book of Shockers	Finalist	
2005	Firoozeh Dumas	Funny in Farsi	Finalist	
2006	Alan Zweibel	The Other Shulman	Winner	
2006	Kinky Friedman	Texas Hold 'Em: How I Was Born in a Manger, Died in the Saddle, and Came Back as a Horny Toad	Finalist	
2006	Bill Scheft	Time Won't Let Me	Finalist	
2007	Joe Keenan	My Lucky Star	Winner	
2007	Merrill Markoe	Walking In Circles Before Lying Down	Finalist	
2007	Bob Newhart	I Shouldn't Even Be Doing This! And Other Things That Strike Me As Funny	Finalist	
2008	Larry Doyle	I Love You, Beth Cooper	Winner	
2008	Patricia Marx	Him Her Him Again the End of Him	Finalist	
2008	Simon Rich	Ant Farm: And Other Desperate Situations	Finalist	
2009	Ian Frazier	Lamentations of the Father	Winner	
2009	Sloane Crosley	I Was Told There'd Be Cake	Finalist	
2009	Don Lee	Wrack and Ruin	Finalist	
2009	Laurie Notaro	The Idiot Girl and the Flaming Tantrum of Death	Finalist	
2010	Steve Hely	How I Became a Famous Novelist	Winner	
2010	Jancee Dunn	Why Is My Mother Getting a Tattoo?	Finalist	
2010	Rhoda Janzen	Mennonite in a Little Black Dress	Finalist	
2011	David Rakoff	Half Empty	Winner	
2011	Mike Birbiglia	Sleepwalk With Me and Other Painfully True Stories	Finalist	
2011	Rick Reilly	Sports from Hell	Finalist	
2012	Calvin Trillin	Quite Enough of Calvin Trillin: Forty Years of Funny Stuff	Winner	
2012	Nate DiMeo	Pawnee: The Greatest Town in America	Finalist	
2012	Patricia Marx	Starting from Happy	Finalist	
2013	Dan Zevin	Dan Gets a Minivan	Winner	
2013	Shalom Auslander	Hope: A Tragedy	Finalist	
2013	Dave Barry and Alan Zweibel	Lunatics	Finalist	
2014	John Kenney	Truth in Advertising	Winner	
2014	Liza Donnelly	Women on Men	Finalist	
2014	Bruce McCall and David Letterman	This Land Was Made for You and Me (But Mostly Me)	Finalist	
2015	Julie Schumacher	Dear Committee Members	Winner	
2015	Roz Chast	Can't We Talk About Something More Pleasant?	Finalist	
2015	Annabelle Gurwitch	I See You Made an Effort: Compliments, Indignities, and Survival Stories from the Edge of 50	Finalist	
2016	Harrison Scott Key	The World's Largest Man	Winner	
2016	Jason Gay	Little Victories	Finalist	
2016	Mary Norris	Between You & Me: Confessions of a Comma Queen	Finalist	
2017	Trevor Noah	Born a Crime	Winner	
2017	Ken Pisani	Amp'd	Finalist	
2017	Aaron Thier	Mr. Eternity	Finalist	
2018	Patricia Lockwood	Priestdaddy	Winner	
2018	Jenny Allen	Would Everybody Please Stop?	Finalist	
2018	John Hodgman	Vacationland: True Stories from Painful Beaches	Finalist	
2019	Simon Rich	Hits and Misses	Winner	
2019	Sloane Crosley	Look Alive Out There	Finalist	
2019	John Kenney	Love Poems for Married People	Finalist	
2020	Damon Young	What Doesn't Kill You Makes You Blacker	Winner	
2020	Dave Barry	Lessons from Lucy	Finalist	
2020	Kira Jane Buxton	Hollow Kingdom	Finalist	
2021	James McBride	Deacon King Kong	Winner	
2021	Mike Birbiglia	The New One: Painfully True Stories from a Reluctant Dad	Finalist	
2021	Alexandra Petri	Nothing Is Wrong and Here Is Why	Finalist	
2022	Steven Rowley	The Guncle	Winner	
2022	Annabelle Gurwitch	You're Leaving When? Adventures in Downward Mobility	Finalist	
2022	Danielle Henderson	The Ugly Cry	Finalist	
2023	S. E. Boyd	The Lemon	Winner	
2023	Elaine Hsieh Chou	Disorientation	Finalist	
2023	Elinor Lipman	Ms. Demeanor	Finalist	
2024	Alexandra Petri	Alexandra Petri's US History	Winner	
2024	Jason Roeder	Griefstrike!	Finalist	
2024	Jane Roper	The Society of Shame	Finalist	
2025	Shalom Auslander	Feh	Finalist	
2025	Alison Espach	The Wedding People	Finalist	
2025	Steven Rowley	The Guncle Abroad	Finalist	
