= Elaine Hsieh Chou =

Taiwanese American author

Elaine Chou
- Born: California, United States
- Notable work: Disorientation

Elaine Hsieh Chou is a Taiwanese American author and screenwriter from California, best known for her debut novel, Disorientation (2022), which was shortlisted for the Thurber Prize for American Humor and Young Lions Fiction Award.

== Career ==
A former Rona Jaffe Graduate Fellow at New York University (NYU) and New York Feminist Art Institute (NYFA) Artist Fellow, Chou's Pushcart Prize-winning short fiction has been published in Guernica, Black Warrior Review, Tin House, Ploughshares, The Atlantic and elsewhere. As a writing and workshop instructor, she has taught fiction at NYU, the Adroit Journal Summer Mentorship Program, Catapult, the Accent Society, Kundiman, and Tin House.

Her debut novel Disorientation was published by Penguin Press in the United States on March 22, 2022; it was first released in the United Kingdom in paperback form by Picador, July 21, 2022. The novel was optioned by Apple TV+ the same month it was released, and a film adaptation was announced on September 27, 2022; Chou is writing the screenplay. The novel received praise, and it was a New York Times Editors' Choice Book and an NPR Best Book of 2022. Chou was shortlisted afterwards for the Thurber Prize for American Humor and Young Lions Fiction Award.

She is the recipient of the 2023 Fred R. Brown Literary Award.

Her multi-genre short story collection Where Are You Really From was published by Penguin Press in 2025.

== Awards ==
Year	Title	Award	Category	Result	Ref
2023	Disorientation	Chinese American Librarians Association Best Book Award	Adult Fiction (成人读物—小说类)	Honor Book	
2023	Disorientation	Thurber Prize for American Humor	—	Shortlisted	
2023	Disorientation	Young Lions Fiction Award	—	Shortlisted	
2023	—	Fred R. Brown Literary Award	—	Won	

== Bibliography ==
=== Books ===
- Disorientation (2022)
- Where Are You Really From (2025)

=== Short stories ===
- "Careless" (September 2018), Cease, Cows
- "A Woman Without Origin" (November 2018), The Normal School
- "A Beast Need to Hunt and I Must Be Caught" (July 2019), Black Warrior Review
- "Carrot Legs" (2019), Guernica (reprinted "in slightly different form" in Where Are You Really From)
- "Skinfolk" (January 13, 2021), Ploughshares, Winter 2020–2021 Issue
- "After the Diversity Panel" (July 9, 2021), Catapult
- "In Which Ms. Swan Suffers Clarity" (September 2021), Black Warrior Review, Issue 47.2
- "Interlude" (2022), Guernica
- "The 100% Silicone Vibrating Ass & Pussy Speaks" (August 2022), LARB Quarterly Journal, "Do You Love Me? issue
- "At 10 a.m. on March 8, Daiso Opened in Flushing" (November 3, 2022), AAWW's The Margins
- "Background" (January 30, 2023) The Atlantic (reprinted "in slightly different form" as "Featured Background" in Where Are You Really From)
