= The Wedding People =

2024 novel by Alison Espach

- Author: Alison Espach
- Language: English
- Genre: Fiction
- Publisher: Henry Holt & Co.
- Publication date: July 30, 2024
- Publication place: United States
- Pages: 384
- ISBN: 9781250899576

The Wedding People is a 2024 novel by American writer Alison Espach. It follows an English professor who travels to a luxury hotel to kill herself, but encounters a wedding party she joins instead. The Wedding People was a New York Times bestseller and received critical praise. It was acquired for film adaptation prior to publication, with Will Speck and Josh Gordon named as directors and Nicole Holofcener as writer.

== Plot ==
Midwestern adjunct English professor Phoebe Stone travels to a luxury hotel in Newport, Rhode Island, to enjoy one last night before she plans to commit suicide in face of her stalled career, recent painful divorce, and failed IVF treatment. When she arrives, she finds that the rest of the hotel is filled with a week-long wedding party. She confesses her plans to the bride, Lila, who tries unsuccessfully to talk her out of it. However, while Phoebe begins her attempt by taking her cat's painkillers, she overhears the opening event of the wedding, and realizes that as with the marriage plot novels her scholarship deals with, here she wants to follow the events of the wedding to their conclusion. She vomits up the pills and survives.

Later that night, Phoebe goes to the hotel hot tub where she strikes up a flirtation with a man in the wedding party; emboldened by her brush with death, she tells him, "I want to fuck you", but he is involved with someone else. The next morning, Lila enlists Phoebe to help fill a sailboat when many of the wedding guests are too hungover for the outing. Arriving at the marina Phoebe learns the man from the hot tub was the groom, Gary, who pretends not to know her. Meanwhile, Lila tells the rest of the group that Phoebe is someone she met at the art gallery where she works. They go boating and Phoebe helps Gary's daughter "Juice" hold a funeral at sea for a mechanical toy pet her late mother had given her, echoing the death of Phoebe's own pet just before she left for Rhode Island.

Lila's maid of honor cancels at the last minute, and Lila designates Phoebe as her replacement, having been confiding in Phoebe about her difficulties with other members of the wedding party. Phoebe accepts and continues the wedding events in her new role. After a drunken bachelorette party, Lila confesses to Phoebe that she is attracted to Jim, the brother of Gary's late wife. She concludes she does not want to marry Gary, but the next morning she makes no mention of it. Meanwhile, wedding events and errands continue to put Gary and Phoebe together, and they grow closer.

On the day of the wedding, Lila is unhappy with the car that arrives to take her to the ceremony. She melts down and declares again that she does not want to marry Gary. This time the decision is final and she sends Phoebe to tell the wedding party. The next day, Phoebe and Gary reunite in the hot tub.

== Publication and film adaption ==
Publishing rights in the U.S. were acquired by Henry Holt and Company, while in the United Kingdom and the Commonwealth they were won by Phoenix Books. Prior to its publication, in early 2024, TriStar Pictures acquired rights to a film adaption of the novel, naming Will Speck and Josh Gordon as directors and Nicole Holofcener as writer.

The book was published on July 30, 2024.

== Reception ==
The book received critical praise. Chicago Tribune columnist John Warner found The Wedding People to be a "highly recommended, deeply satisfying read." Ginny Hogan, writing in Literary Hub, praised the novel as one of three recent novels that focus on a "toxic" relationship between female characters. The USA Today reviewer called it "incredibly nuanced and resonant".

A Washington Post review of the audiobook adaption, narrated by Helen Laser, highlighted Laser's versatility in voicing the various characters.

The Wedding People appeared on the New York Times Best Seller list and won the fiction category in the 2024 Goodreads Choice Awards. Time magazine named it one of a hundred "Must-Read" books for that year. Today show host Jenna Bush Hager selected The Wedding People for the show's book club.

The novel was shortlisted for the 'Published Novels' section of the 2025 Comedy Women in Print Prize. It is a finalist for the 2025 Thurber Prize for American Humor.
