= Damon Young (writer) =

American writer and editor

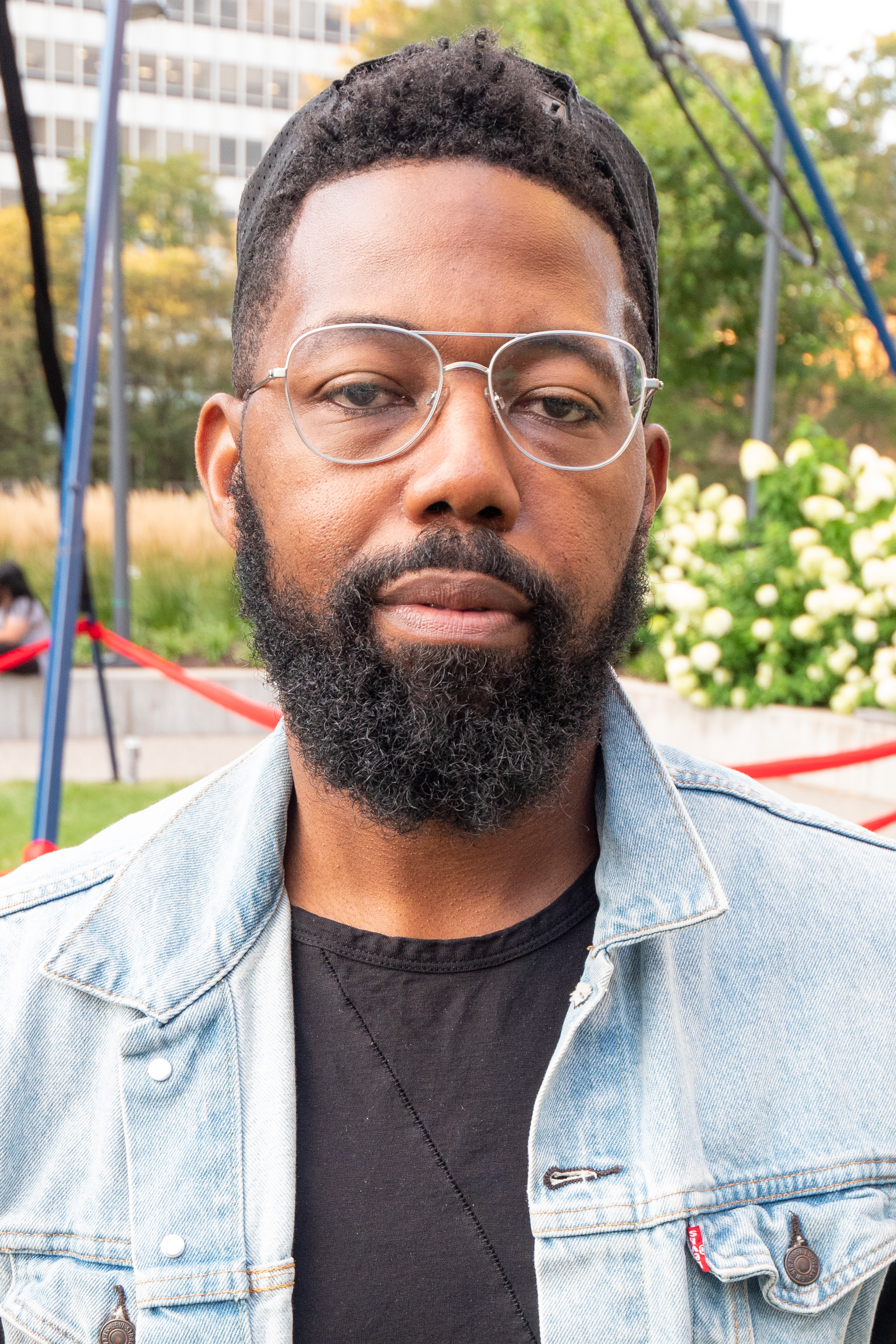
- Born: Pittsburgh, Pennsylvania, U.S.
- Education: Canisius College
- Occupations: Writer, editor
- Children: 2
- Writing career
- Language: English
- Years active: 2008–present
- Genre: Non-fiction
- Notable work: What Doesn't Kill You Makes You Blacker
- Literary movement: Black

Damon Young (born December 30, 1978) is an American writer and editor. He is the co-founder of the blog Very Smart Brothas. Young released his first book, What Doesn't Kill You Makes You Blacker, in 2019 with HarperCollins.

== Early life and education ==
Young was born in Pittsburgh, Pennsylvania, to Vivienne and Wilbur Young. He spent most of his adolescence in East Liberty. As a teenager, Young lived in Penn Hills where he became a basketball player for Penn Hills High School. He earned a basketball scholarship at Canisius College, graduating with a degree in English in 2002.

== Career ==
Young co-founded a website called Very Smart Brothas (VSB) in 2008 with D. Marcellus Wright, who uses the pen name Panama Jackson. The website featured essays on pop culture, politics, and absurdist humor written for an African-American audience. Gizmodo Media Group acquired VSB in 2016. It is now a vertical on the website The Root.

He is also a columnist for GQ, and a contributing opinion writer for The New York Times. Young became a weekly contributing columnist for The Washington Post in January, 2022.

Young signed a two-book publishing deal with HarperCollins' Ecco imprint in November 2016. His first book, What Doesn't Kill You Makes You Blacker: A Memoir in Essays, was released in March 2019. Consisting of a collection of personal essays primarily about race, gender, class, and Black identity, the book received positive critical attention. Publishers Weekly wrote in a review: "Young's charm and wit make these essays a pleasure to read; his candid approach makes them memorable." Karamagi Rujumba wrote for the Post-Gazette: " 'What Doesn't Kill You Makes You Blacker' is in equal parts a deeply introspective account of a life and an astute critique of the contours along which black people survive the limitations of historic and systemic racism." Michael Kleber-Diggs wrote for the Star Tribune: "Readers who know Young's work from the blog he co-founded, Very Smart Brothas, will recognize his voice, his fondness for lists, his precise, comprehensive and spectacular references to pop culture, his wit, and his keen mind." The book won the 2020 Thurber Prize for American Humor.

Ebony named him to its Power 100 2017 list under the Luminaries category.

== Personal life ==
Young is married and has a daughter and son. He resides in Pittsburgh, Pennsylvania.

== Works ==
- Your Degrees Won’t Keep You Warm At Night Lexington, KY: Very Smart Brothas Media, 2011. ISBN 9781453708767, OCLC 702658318
- What Doesn't Kill You Makes You Blacker New York, NY: Ecco, 2019. ISBN 9780062684301, OCLC 1090242570
- That's How They Get You: An Unruly Anthology of Black American Humor New York, NY: Pantheon, 2025. ISBN 9780593317112
