= Alison Espach =

American novelist (born 1984)

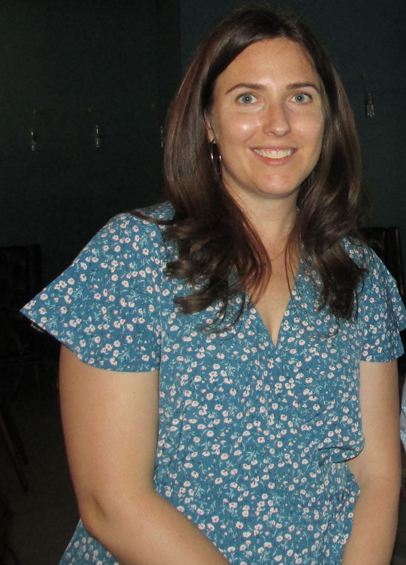
- Espach in 2022
- Born: September 26, 1984 (age 41) Trumbull, Connecticut, U.S.
- Occupation: Novelist
- Notable works: The Adults (2011); Notes on Your Sudden Disappearance (2022); The Wedding People (2024)

Website
- alisonespach.com

Alison Espach (born September 26, 1984) is an American novelist. Espach is the author of three novels—The Adults (2011), Notes on Your Sudden Disappearance (2022), and The Wedding People (2024). She is a professor of English at Providence College in Rhode Island.

== Biography ==
Espach was born in Trumbull, Connecticut, on September 26, 1984. She is a 2007 graduate of Providence College in Providence, Rhode Island, where English professor Peter Johnson was a mentor.

After graduation, she pursued a Master of Fine Arts at Washington University in St. Louis, Missouri, during which she wrote a thesis that would become her first novel, The Adults (2011). She moved to New York to teach writing after completing the program. In 2013, she joined the faculty of Providence College. She is a professor of English.

== Novels ==
=== The Adults (2011) ===
The Adults is a novel centered on a teenage girl growing up in a small, wealthy town in Connecticut. It was published by Charles Scribner's Sons in early 2011.

In the New York Times, literary critic Janet Maslin's review characterized the work as a "coming of age with a quick wit and a sharp eye". Kirkus Reviews found the work to be "an enviable first effort." Dreamscape Media produced an audiobook, which was read by Tavia Gilbert; her narration was received positively by AudioFile magazine, with its reviewer writing that "Subtle shifts of tone are all Gilbert needs to give Emily a convincing voice".

Film producers Jamie Patricof and Lynette Howell, of Electric City Entertainment, optioned the rights to the novel in 2012.

=== Notes on Your Sudden Disappearance (2022) ===
Espach's second novel depicts a family following the death of its eldest child. Kirkus Reviews described it as a "tragicomic bildungsroman in the shadow of loss".

Henry Holt and Company's hardcover design features a 2016 painting, "The Swimming Pool", by T. S. Harris from the stock photo website Bridgeman Images, while the paperback features a commercial stock photo of flowers behind the typography. Macmillan Audio released an audiobook adaptation narrated by Jesse Vilinsky.

=== The Wedding People (2024) ===
In Espach's third novel, The Wedding People, Phoebe Stone travels to a hotel in Newport, Rhode Island to enjoy one last night of self-indulgence before killing herself by drug overdose. Her planned suicide is averted when she befriends the bride of a wedding being held at the hotel. The Wedding People appeared on the New York Times Best Seller list and won the fiction category in the 2024 Goodreads Choice Awards. It was shortlisted for the 'Published Novels' section of the 2025 Comedy Women in Print Prize. It is a finalist for the 2025 Thurber Prize for American Humor.

Prior to its publication, in early 2024, TriStar Pictures was reported to have acquired rights to a film adaption of the novel, naming Will Speck and Josh Gordon as directors and Nicole Holofcener as writer. Chicago Tribune columnist John Warner found The Wedding People to be a "highly recommended, deeply satisfying read." A Washington Post review of the audiobook adaption, narrated by Helen Laser, highlighted Laser's versatility in voicing the various characters.
