= Patricia Marx (humorist) =

American humorist and writer

- Born: Abington Township, Montgomery County, Pennsylvania, U.S.
- Education: Harvard University (BA)
- Occupations: Humorist; writer

Patricia Marx is an American humorist and writer. She currently works as a staff writer for The New Yorker, and teaches at Columbia University, Princeton University and 92nd Street Y.

Born in Abington, Pennsylvania, she earned her B.A. from Harvard University in 1975. Her writing has appeared in The New York Times, The New Yorker, Vogue, and The Atlantic Monthly. Marx is a former writer for Saturday Night Live and Rugrats, and the first woman elected to the Harvard Lampoon. She is the author of the 2007 novel, Him Her Him Again The End of Him, as well as several humor books and children's books.

== Bibliography ==
=== Books ===
Novels

- Marx, Patricia (2007). Him her him again the end of him. New York: Scribner.
- — (2011). Starting from happy. New York: Simon & Schuster.

Humor

- Marx, Patricia & Charlotte Stuart (1983). How to regain your virginity – and 99 other recent discoveries about sex. New York: Workman.
- Marx, Patricia (1985). You can never go wrong by lying : and other solutions to the moral and social dilemmas of our time. Boston: Houghton Mifflin.
- Blockbuster, (with Douglas G. McGrath), (New York: Bantam Books, 1988)
- You Know You're a Workaholic When--, (New York: Workman, 1993)
- 1,003 Great Things about Getting Older, (with Lisa Birnbach and Ann Hodgman, and David Owen), (Kansas City: Andrews McMeel, 1997)
- 1,003 Great Things about Kids, (with Lisa Birnbach and Ann Hodgman), (Kansas City: Andrews McMeel, 1998)
- 1,003 Great Things about Friends, (with Lisa Birnbach and Ann Hodgman), (Kansas City: Andrews McMeel, 1999)
- The Skinny: What Every Skinny Woman Knows about Dieting (and Won't Tell You!), (with Susan Sistrom), humor (New York: Dell, 1999)
- 1,003 Great Things about Teachers, (with Lisa Birnbach and Ann Hodgman), (Kansas City: Andrews McMeel, 2000)
- 1,003 Great Things about Moms, (with Lisa Birnbach and Ann Hodgman), (Kansas City: Andrews McMeel, 2002)
- 1,003 Great Things about America, (with Lisa Birnbach and Ann Hodgman), (Kansas City: Andrews McMeel, 2002)
- Birnbach, Lisa; Ann Hodgman & Patricia Marx (2004). 1,003 great things to smile about. Kansas City: Andrews McMeel.
- —; — & — (2005). 1,003 great things about being a woman. Kansas City: Andrews McMeel.
- You Know You're 40 When--, (with Ann Hodgman), (New York: Broadway Books, 2004)
- Marx, Patricia (2015). Let's be less stupid : an attempt to maintain my mental faculties. New York: Twelve.
- Why Don't You Write My Eulogy Now So I Can Correct It? (illustrated by Roz Chast), (New York: Celadon Books, 2019)
- You Can Only Yell at Me for One Thing at a Time (illustrated by Roz Chast), (New York: Celadon Books, 2020)

Children's books

- Dot in Larryland: The Big Little Book of an Odd-Sized Friendship, (illustrated by Roz Chast), (New York: Bloomsbury Publishing U.S.A. Children's Books, 2009)

=== Essays and reporting ===
- Marx, Patricia (December 8, 2008). "The price is right". On and Off the Avenue. The New Yorker.
- — (January 16, 2012). "A bushel and a peck". On and Off the Avenue. The New Yorker. 87 (44): 32–36.
- — (January 30, 2012). "Me, reading". Shouts & Murmurs. The New Yorker. 87 (46): 35.
- — (April 16, 2012). "You're welcome". Dept. of Travel. The New Yorker. 88 (9): 50–55. (Note: Couch-surfing the globe.)
- — (January 14, 2013). "Outsource yourself : the online way to delegate your chores". On and Off the Avenue. The New Yorker. 88 (43): 32–35.
- — (March 4, 2013). "Ladies". Shouts & Murmurs. The New Yorker. 89 (3): 35.
- — (March 25, 2013). "Patagonia". Goings on About Town. On and Off the Avenue. The New Yorker. 89 (6): 34.
- — (August 5, 2013). "Free and the brave". Goings on About Town. On and Off the Avenue. The New Yorker. 89 (23): 9.
- — (February 3, 2014). "A tale of a tub : why go on a cruise when you can go on a freighter?". Our Far-Flung Correspondents. The New Yorker. 89 (47): 26–31.
- — (October 20, 2014). "Pets allowed : why are so many animals now in places where they shouldn't be?". Our Local Correspondents. The New Yorker. 90 (32): 36–41.
- — (March 23, 2015). "About face : why is South Korea the world's plastic-surgery capital?". Letter from Seoul. The New Yorker. 91 (5): 50–55. (Note: Online version is titled "The world capital of plastic surgery".)
- — (May 27, 2019). "23 and him". Shouts & Murmurs. The New Yorker. 95 (14): 31.
- — (September 7, 2020). "Rear Window redux". The Talk of the Town. Dept. of Swaps. The New Yorker. 96 (26): 21–22. (Note: Online version is titled "The joys of looking out a stranger's window".)
- — (March 29, 2021). "Stand up straight! Has the pandemic made us all slouches?". On and Off the Avenue. The New Yorker. 97 (6): 30–33. (Note: Online version is titled "Is the pandemic breaking our backs?".)

———————

Bibliography notes
