= Patricia Lockwood =

American poet and author (born 1982)

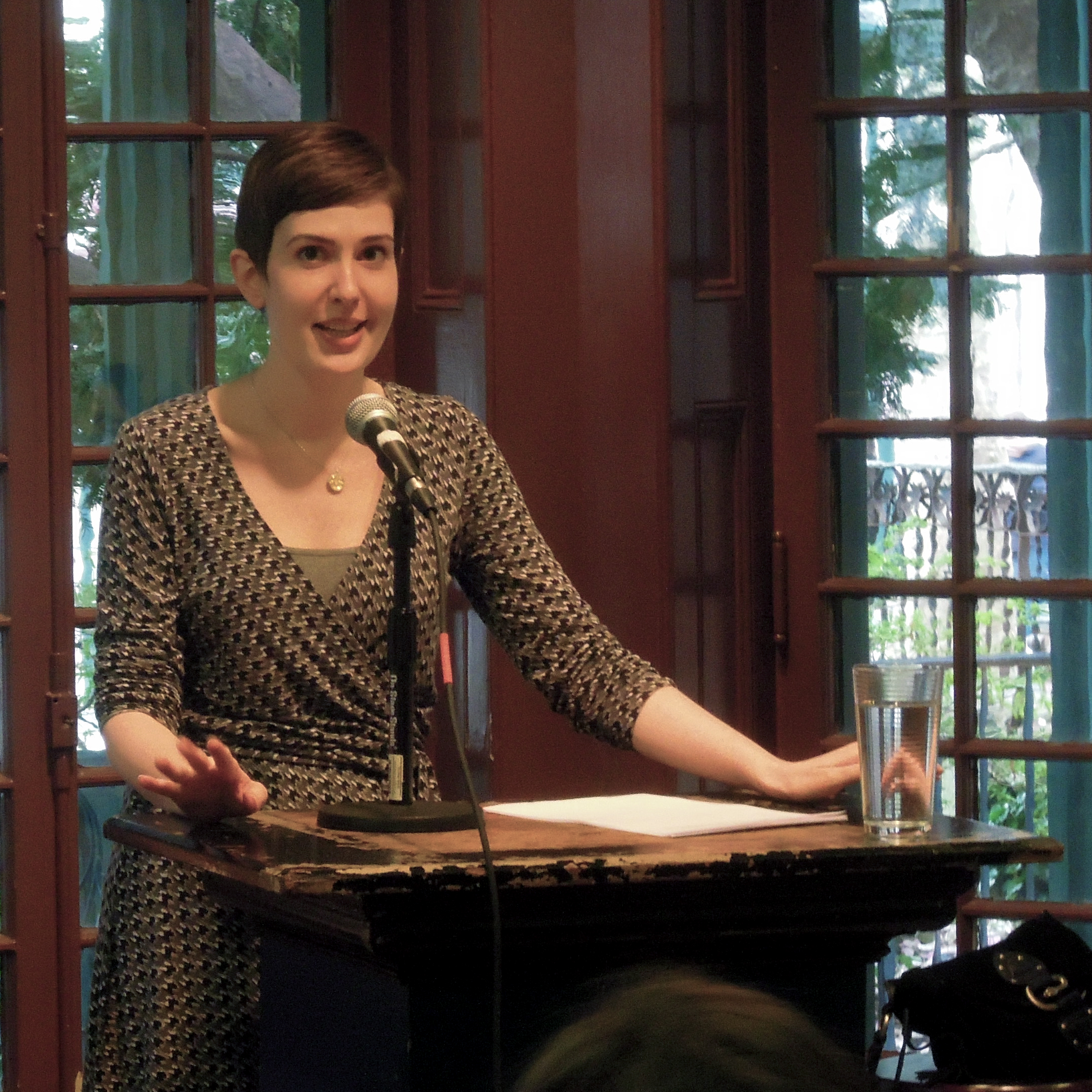
- Lockwood in 2014
- Born: April 27, 1982 (age 44); Fort Wayne, Indiana U.S.
- Occupation: Writer
- Writing career
- Language: English
- Period: 2004–present
- Notable works: "Rape Joke", Priestdaddy, No One Is Talking About This
- Notable awards: Thurber Prize for American Humor (2018); Dylan Thomas Prize (2022)

Patricia Lockwood (born April 27, 1982) is an American poet, novelist, and essayist. Beginning a career in poetry, her collections include Motherland Fatherland Homelandsexuals, a 2014 New York Times Notable Book. Later prose works received more exposure and notoriety. Her 2017 memoir Priestdaddy won the Thurber Prize for American Humor and her 2021 debut novel, No One Is Talking About This, was shortlisted for the Booker Prize and won the Dylan Thomas Prize. In addition to her writing activities, she has been a contributing editor for the London Review of Books since 2019 and was a judge for the 2026 Booker Prize.

Lockwood works across a variety of genres. "Your work can flow into the shape that people make for you," she told Slate in an interview in 2020. "Or you can try to break that shape." In 2022, she received the American Academy of Arts and Letters' Morton Dauwen Zabel Award for her contributions to the field of experimental writing.

Lockwood is the only writer with both fiction and nonfiction works selected as the 10 Best Books of the Year by The New York Times. At four years, she also holds the record for the shortest span between repeat appearances on the list.

Kirkus Reviews has called her "our guide to moving beyond thinking of the internet as a thing apart from real lives and real art," and Garden & Gun: "goddess of the avant-garde."

"Lockwood is the literary Frankenchild of Dorothy Parker and Flannery O’Connor," observed Beejay Silcox for The Guardian, "a heretical wit fused with gothic strangeness." Writing for The New York Times Book Review, Merve Emre dubbed Lockwood "a modern word witch, her writing splendid and sordid by turns."

== Early life ==
Lockwood was born in Fort Wayne, Indiana. She has four siblings. Her father Greg Lockwood found religion while serving as a seaman on a nuclear submarine in the Cold War. His conversion first led him to the Lutheran Church, then to its ministry, and finally to Roman Catholicism. In 1984, he asked ordination as a married Catholic priest from then St. Louis Archbishop John L. May under a special pastoral provision issued by Pope John Paul II in 1980. Lockwood therefore had the rare experience of growing up in a Catholic rectory, as part of a traditional American nuclear family, but with a priest as a father. Lockwood grew up in St. Louis, Missouri and Cincinnati, Ohio, attending parochial schools there, but never went to college. She is a 2000 YoungArts alumnus.

== Career ==
In 2011, Lockwood joined Twitter and drew attention there for her comedy and poetics, including the ironic "sext" form she originated, and association with the Weird Twitter movement. The Atlantic named Lockwood on its list of "The Best Tweets of All Time", where she was the only author included twice. In response to Lockwood's popular tweet ".@parisreview So is paris any good or not," The Paris Review has twice issued reviews of Paris.

In 2012, small press Octopus Books published Lockwood's first poetry collection, Balloon Pop Outlaw Black. The Chicago Tribune praised the work for its "savage intelligence." The collection was included in end-of-year lists by The New Yorker and Pitchfork and became one of the best-selling indie poetry titles of all time. Its cover features original artwork by cartoonist Lisa Hanawalt.

In July 2013, general interest website The Awl published Lockwood's prose poem "Rape Joke". The poem develops a personal experience Lockwood had at age 19 into a broader commentary on rape culture. The Guardian wrote that the poem "casually reawakened a generation's interest in poetry." The Poetry Foundation declared the poem "world famous." The poem was selected for the 2014 edition of The Best American Poetry series and won a Pushcart Prize. It has since been translated into more than 20 languages.

In 2014, Penguin Books published Lockwood's second poetry collection, Motherland Fatherland Homelandsexuals. The book's cover features more original artwork by Hanawalt. The New York Times critic Dwight Garner praised the book for its "indelible, dreamlike details." Stephanie Burt, writing for The New York Times Book Review, lauded it as "at once angrier, and more fun, more attuned to our time and more bizarre, than most poetry can ever get." The Stranger dubbed Motherland Fatherland Homelandsexuals "the first true book of poetry to be published in the 21st century." Rolling Stone included Lockwood and the book on its 2014 Hot List and The New York Times named it a Notable Book.

Riverhead Books published Lockwood's memoir Priestdaddy in May 2017. The book, called "electric" by The New York Times and "remarkable" by The Washington Post, chronicles her return as an adult to live in her father's rectory and deals with issues of family, belief, belonging, and personhood. In July 2017, Imagine Entertainment announced it had optioned Priestdaddy for development as a limited TV series. The memoir was named one of the 10 best books of 2017 by The New York Times Book Review, one of the best books of the year by The Washington Post, The Boston Globe, Chicago Tribune, The Sunday Times, The Guardian, The New Yorker, The Atlantic, New York, Elle, NPR, Amazon, Publishers Weekly, among others, was a finalist for the Kirkus Prize, and was awarded the 2018 Thurber Prize for American Humor. In 2019, The New York Times included the book on its list "The 50 Best Memoirs of the Past 50 Years," and The Guardian named it one of the 100 best books of the 21st century.

Riverhead also published Lockwood's debut novel, No One Is Talking About This, in February 2021. It was simultaneously released by Bloomsbury in the UK. The book follows an unnamed female protagonist's interactions with a virtual platform called "the portal." Lockwood has acknowledged that much of the second part of No One Is Talking About This was inspired by real-life events surrounding her niece Lena, the first person diagnosed in utero with Proteus syndrome. Writing for The New York Review of Books, Clair Wills praised the novel as "an arch descendant of Austen's socio-literary style — a novel of observation, crossed with a memoir of a family crisis, and written as a prose poem, steeped in metaphor." In The Wall Street Journal, Emily Bobrow called the novel "artful" and "an intimate and moving portrait of love and grief." It won the 2022 Dylan Thomas Prize, was shortlisted for the 2021 Booker Prize, and was one of the New York Times' 10 Best Books of 2021. In 2024, The Atlantic included No One Is Talking About This among its Great American Novels.

In September 2025, Riverhead published Lockwood's second novel, Will There Ever Be Another You, which follows a writer whose life, relationships, and work are upended when she develops a chronic illness. The novel begins in Scotland, with the same cast of characters as No One Is Talking About This and picking up where that narrative left off, but the storyline abruptly disintegrates when the protagonist develops a debilitating illness and her sensations, feelings, and ideas become unreliable and take primacy over events. What follows is a broad exploration of the self, family, illness, caregiving, art, creativity, and the structure of thought, told through various forms including fiction, memoir, essays, diaries, travelogues, lectures, and even literary criticism. Upon publication, the novel received positive reviews from critics. For The New York Review of Books, critic Frances Wilson called it "a magnificent feat." In the New York Times, Dwight Garner praised the work's "weight and charm", rating it "a mixed success". For the Washington Post, which lauded the book as "reliably brilliant," Maddie Crum wrote: "More so than an arc, the book takes the form of bright coruscations, shedding light on a few questions." The New Yorker, which placed the novel among its best books of the year, observed that "the disease swiftly robs (the protagonist) of the ability to read, speak, or write coherently, and its warped imprint on her inner life becomes not just the subject but the form of the novel." In Slate, Laura Miller heralded "chapters jungly with bewildering language that occasionally open out into exhilarating clearings" and said Will There Ever Be Another You was "considerably more challenging than (Lockwood’s) other books."

Penguin Poets published Agate Head/Stone Soup, a double collection featuring more than 60 new poems from Lockwood, in October 2026.

Lockwood's essays and literary criticism, most notably in the London Review of Books, have been collected in The Best American Essays series and introduced works by authors including Virginia Woolf, Joan Didion, and Rachel Ingalls. The New Yorker has called Lockwood "a wizardly reviewer," and The Paris Review has celebrated her as "a cultural critic at the height of her powers." Praising her "fine thinking" and "purposeful comedy," The New York Times Magazine's Wyatt Mason concluded, "Nothing will get you to read literary criticism" if Lockwood can't.

== Personal life ==
Lockwood is married to Jason Kendall, "a journalist, designer, and editor." "She married at 21, has scarcely ever held a job and, by her telling, seems to have spent her adult life in a Proustian attitude, writing for hours each day from her 'desk-bed'," according to a profile in The New York Times Magazine.

Lockwood and her husband have three cats named Miette, Fenriz, and Gilly. Lockwood contracted COVID-19 in March 2020, and as of February 2021 was still living with long COVID symptoms.

== Awards and nominations ==
Year	Work	Award	Category	Result	Ref.
2015	"Rape Joke"	Pushcart Prize	—	Selected	
2017	Priestdaddy	Goodreads Choice Award	Memoir & Autobiography	Nominated—20th	
2017	Priestdaddy	Kirkus Prize	Nonfiction	Shortlisted	
2018	Priestdaddy	Thurber Prize for American Humor	—	Won	
2021	No One Is Talking About This	Booker Prize	—	Shortlisted	
2021	No One Is Talking About This	Center for Fiction First Novel Prize	—	Shortlisted	
2021	No One Is Talking About This	Women's Prize for Fiction	—	Shortlisted	
2022	No One Is Talking About This	Dylan Thomas Prize	—	Won	
2022	No One Is Talking About This	International Dublin Literary Award	—	Longlisted	
2026	Will There Ever Be Another You	Gabe Hudson Prize	—	Won	
2026	Will There Ever Be Another You	Georgia Author of the Year Award	Literary Fiction	Won	
2026	Will There Ever Be Another You	Joyce Carol Oates Literary Prize	—	Longlisted	

== Bibliography ==
=== Fiction ===
- —— (2021). No One Is Talking About This. Riverhead Books. ISBN 9780593189580.
- —— (2025). Will There Ever Be Another You. Riverhead Books. ISBN 9780593718551.

=== Nonfiction ===
- —— (2017). Priestdaddy. Riverhead Books. ISBN 9781594633737.

=== Poetry collections ===
- —— (2012). Balloon Pop Outlaw Black (paperback ed.). Octopus Books. ISBN 9780985118228.
- —— (2014). Motherland Fatherland Homelandsexuals (paperback ed.). Penguin Books. ISBN 9780141984865.
- ——; Michael Robbins; Timothy Thornton (2017). Penguin Modern Poets 2: Controlled Explosions: Michael Robbins, Patricia Lockwood, Timothy Thornton. Penguin Books.
- —— (2026). Agate Head/Stone Soup (paperback ed.). Penguin Books. ISBN 9780143139485.

=== Selected poems ===
All poems published by Lockwood.

Year	Title and debut publication
2011	"Love Poem Like We Used to Write It". The New Yorker. November 28, 2011.
2012	"The Arch". Poetry. April 1, 2012.
2013	"Rape Joke". The Awl. July 25, 2013.
2013	"What Is the Zoo for What". The New Yorker. Vol. 89, no. 34. October 28, 2013. pp. 56–57.
2013	"Government Spending". Poetry. December 1, 2013.
2013	"The Hypno-Domme Speaks, and Speaks and Speaks". Poetry. December 1, 2013.
2017	"Jewel Thief Movie". Poetry. September 1, 2017.
2017	"The Ode on a Grecian Urn". Poetry. September 1, 2017.
2017	"The Pinch". The Awl. March 16, 2017.
2018	"How Do We Write Now". Tin House. April 10, 2018.
2025	"Cave Painting". The Paris Review. September 25, 2025.
2025	"An Agate a Day". n+1. September 25, 2025.
2025	"Sorry for Existing". The New Yorker. October 27, 2025.
2025	"Garnets". The London Review of Books. November 6, 2025.
2025	"Feel It". The Yale Review. December 21, 2025.
2026	"Moon Marble". Harper's. February 1, 2026.
2026	"The Beach Where All Babies Are Born". The New York Review of Books. March 5, 2026.
2026	"Quenepas". The Oxford American. April 14, 2026.
2026	"Byzantine Room". The Atlantic. May 1, 2026.
2026	"95 Irving Street". Basket. May 11, 2026.
2026	"Rosarita". The London Review of Books. May 13, 2026.
2026	"Dorabella". The Yale Review. June 8, 2026.
2026	"Agate Head". The Nation. June 30, 2026.
2026	"Bicycle Built for Two". Poetry. July 1, 2026.
2026	"Polish Flint". Poetry. July 1, 2026.
2026	"Gold Tooth Song for Sally". Poetry Northwest. July 6, 2026.
2026	"Isamu Noguchi". The Sewanee Review. July 30, 2026.
2026	"The World". The London Review of Books. August 13, 2026.
2026	"Crows Use Pro Tools". The Threepenny Review. August 27, 2026.
2026	"r/Nostalgia". Granta. September 10, 2026.
2026	"The Books Are Bad". The Believer. September 30, 2026.
2026	"Sensual Songs for Eight-Year-Olds". Lit Hub. October 6, 2026.
2026	"Art Chat". The Walrus. October 6, 2026.
