= Disorientation (novel) =

2022 novel by Elaine Hsieh Chou

- Hardcover 1st ed.
- Author: Elaine Hsieh Chou
- Language: English
- Genre: Satire; Humor; Political fiction
- Set in: Massachusetts
- Publisher: Penguin Group
- Publication date: March 22, 2022
- Publication place: United States
- Media type: Print (paperback & hardcover), audiobook, ebook, kindle, audible
- Pages: 416 pp
- ISBN: 9780593298350 (hardcover 1st ed.)
- OCLC: 1257480088
- Dewey Decimal: 813/.6
- LC Class: PS3603.H686 D57 2022

Disorientation is a 2022 satirical humor political fiction novel by Taiwanese American writer Elaine Hsieh Chou. The novel was published by Penguin Group on March 22, 2022.

== Synopsis ==
The novel follows Ingrid Yang, an eighth-year PhD student studying the work of late Chinese-American poet, Xiao-Wen Chou, described as the "so-called Chinese Robert Frost." The story takes place at Barnes University, a university in fictional Wittlebury, Massachusetts. Originally, Michael Bartholemew, Ingrid's white advisor and chair of the East Asian Studies department at Barnes, pressured Ingrid into studying Chou's poetry, even though she finds Chou stereotypical and boring. After spending long nights studying the Chou archives at Barnes, and struggling to find inspiration for her dissertation, Ingrid finds a note in unfamiliar handwriting revealing new information about Chou's poetry. Feeling motivated to uncover this mystery and find a new angle for her dissertation, Ingrid, along with her friend Eunice, discovers that the handwriting on the note belongs to John Smith.

Ingrid and Eunice decide to break into John Smith's home to learn more about him. While inside his house, Ingrid watches the man who she thought was Xiao-Wen Chou take off his black wig, yellowface makeup, and eyelid tape, and reveal John Smith, a white man underneath.

Ingrid decides to anonymously out Xiao-Wen Chou as John Smith, causing chaos and scandal on campus. Vivian Vo, Ingrid's academic nemesis in the postcolonial studies department, leads campus activism around racial justice, causing Ingrid to reexamine her once-held beliefs. In this context, Ingrid also negotiates her relationship with her fiance Stephen, a white translator of Japanese literature.

== Writing and publication ==
The novel was originally a "very serious novel set on campus" but Chou changed the direction of the book after the controversy over Michael Derrick Hudson's pseudonymous publication of poems under the name Yi-Fen Chou.

== Reception ==
In The Washington Post, Leland Cheuk wrote, "'Disorientation' does what great comedies and satires are supposed to do: make you laugh while forcing you to ponder the uncomfortable implications of every punchline...Chou's novel is a promising debut, one that makes this reader look forward to what she will make fun next." In The New York Times Book Review, Steph Cha described the satire as "frequently funny and insightful, with plenty to say about art, identity, orientalism and the politics of academia." On the other hand, Kirkus Reviews, in an unfavorable review, noted that the ideas in the novel "get buried beneath weak character development."

== Accolades ==
Chou was nominated for the Young Lions Fiction Award for the novel, and it was shortlisted for the Thurber Prize for American Humor.

Year	Award	Category	Result	Ref
2023	Chinese American Librarians Association Best Book Award	Adult Fiction (成人读物—小说类)	Honor Book	
2023	Thurber Prize for American Humor	—	Shortlisted	
2023	Young Lions Fiction Award	—	Shortlisted	

== Film adaptation ==
On September 27, 2022, Apple Studios, Hyperobject Industries' Adam McKay, and Malala Yousafzai and Erika Kennair's company Extracurricular announced that they were planning to produce a film adaptation of the novel. There has been no new information since then.
