= Gork, the Teenage Dragon =

2017 novel by Gabe Hudson

- Author: Gabe Hudson
- Language: English
- Genre: Novel
- Publisher: Alfred A. Knopf
- Publication date: 11 July 2017
- Publication place: United States
- ISBN: 978-0-375-41396-4

Gork, the Teenage Dragon is the debut novel by American writer Gabe Hudson. The novel takes place at WarWings Military Academy for Draconum, an elite high school for young dragons. About this novel, Dave Eggers wrote, "No good human won't love this dragon named Gork."

The publisher Alfred A. Knopf states: "A love story, a fantasy, and a coming-of-age story, Gork the Teenage Dragon is a wildly comic, beautifully imagined, and deeply heartfelt debut novel that shows us just how human a dragon can be."
