= Funny in Farsi =

2003 memoir by Firoozeh Dumas

Funny in Farsi: A Memoir of Growing Up Iranian in America
- First edition
- Author: Firoozeh Dumas
- Language: English
- Genre: Memoir
- Publisher: Villard
- Publication date: 2003
- Publication place: United States
- Media type: Print (Hardcover)
- Pages: 208 pp
- ISBN: 0-8129-6837-9

Funny in Farsi: A Memoir of Growing Up Iranian in America is a 2003 memoir by Iranian American author Firoozeh Dumas. The book describes Dumas's move with her family in 1972, at age seven, from Iran to Whittier, California, and her life in the United States for the next several decades (with a brief return to Iran). The book describes adjusting to the different culture and dealing with her extended family, most of whom also moved to the U.S. in the 1970s. It was Dumas's first book.

Funny in Farsi was on the bestseller lists of the San Francisco Chronicle, the Los Angeles Times, and the New York Times.

The book was translated into Persian language and became a bestseller in Iran in 2005, selling over 100,000 copies. In 2012, the book's Iranian translator, Mohammed Soleimani Nia, was arrested by Iranian authorities, although this may have been unrelated to the book.

In 2008, Dumas followed up Funny in Farsi with a second memoir, Laughing Without an Accent.

== Awards and honors ==
Funny in Farsi was a finalist for a PEN Center USA award in 2004, a finalist for an Audie Award for best audiobook in 2005, and a finalist for the Thurber Prize for American Humor in 2005.

== Television adaptation ==
In 2009, a pilot episode was filmed for ABC for a sitcom based on the book, also called Funny in Farsi, and directed by Barry Sonnenfeld. The pilot was not picked up for a series and was never aired.
