= Grief Is for People =

2024 memoir by Sloane Crosley

- Author: Sloane Crosley
- Language: English
- Publication date: 2024
- Publication place: United States

Grief Is for People is a 2024 memoir by American author Sloane Crosley.

== Writing and publication ==
The memoir concerns a burglary of Crosley's apartment, during which jewelry was stolen, and the suicide of her close friend Russell Perreault.

=== Cover ===
The memoir's cover was designed by Alex Merto.
