= Mary Norris (copy editor) =

American writer (born 1952)

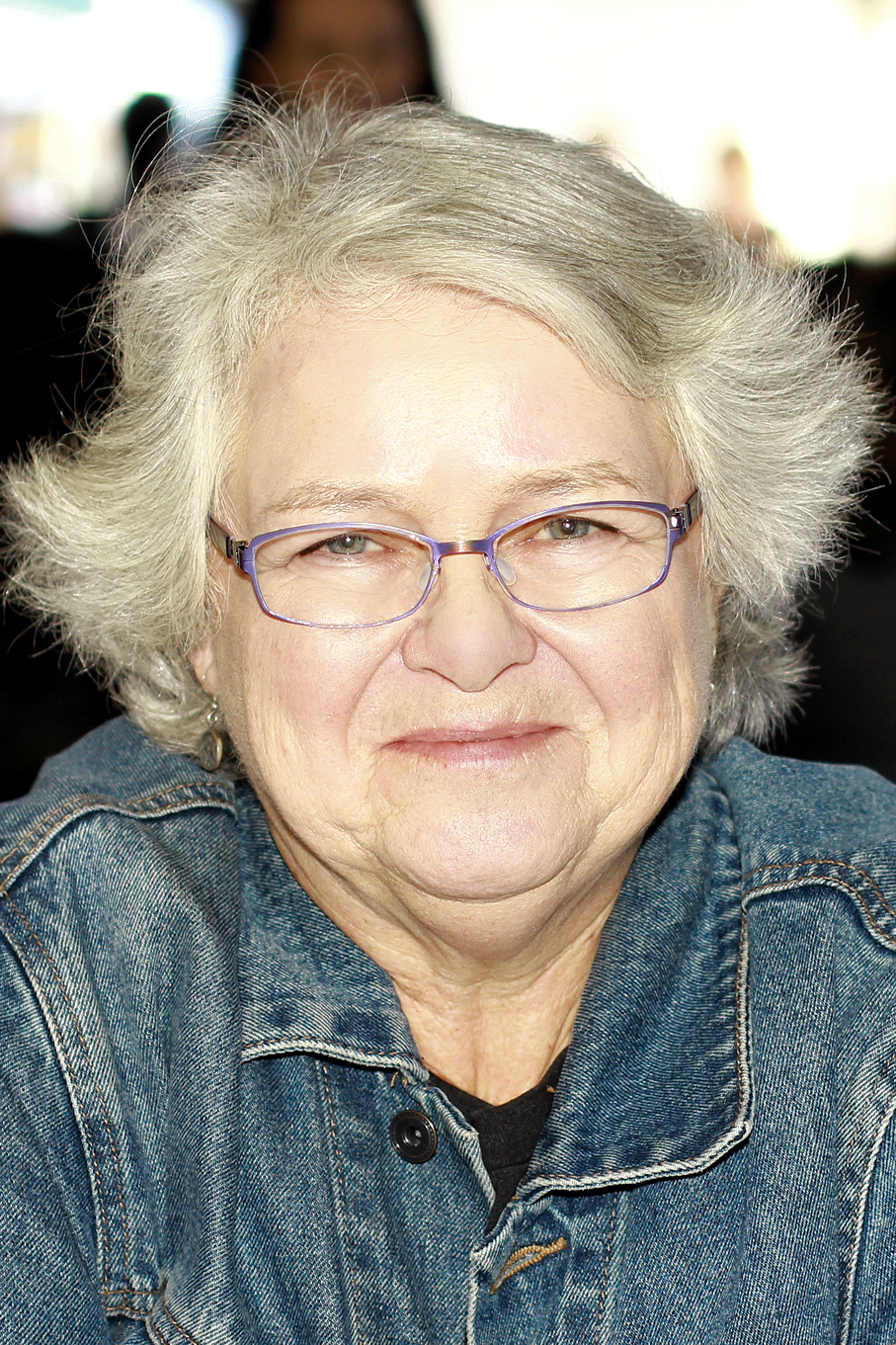
- Norris at the 2019 Texas Book Festival
- Born: February 7, 1952 (age 74); Cleveland, Ohio, United States
- Education: Rutgers University; University of Vermont
- Occupations: Copy editor, writer, author
- Website: commaqueen.net

Mary Norris (born February 7, 1952) is an American author, writer and copy editor for The New Yorker.

== Early life ==
Mary Norris was raised in Cleveland, Ohio. She graduated from Rutgers University in 1974 and earned a master's degree in English from the University of Vermont.

== Career ==
Norris joined the editorial staff at The New Yorker in 1978. She has been a query proofreader at the magazine since 1993. She has also been a contributor to "The Talk of the Town" and The New Yorker website.

Her first book, Between You & Me: Confessions of a Comma Queen, was published by W. W. Norton & Co in 2015. Norris was a finalist in the 2016 Thurber Prize for American Humor for Between You & Me. She gave a TED talk at TED2016 on the same topic. Her second book, Greek to Me – Adventures of a Comma Queen (2019), explores her relation to foreign languages, particularly to classical Greek.
