= Firoozeh Dumas =

Iranian-American writer

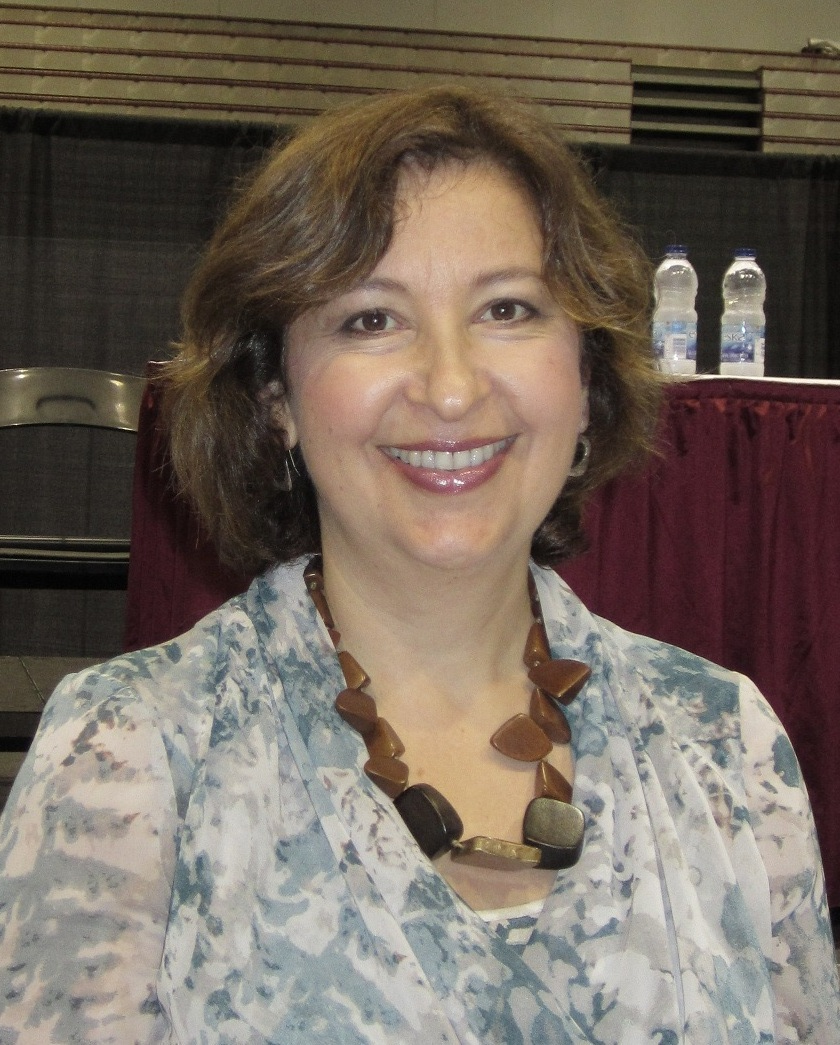
- Firoozeh Dumas at McMaster University in 2012
- Born: Firoozeh Jazayeri; June 26, 1965 (age 60); Abadan, Iran
- Occupations: Author, humorist

Firoozeh Dumas (Persian: فیروزه دوما) (born June 26, 1965, in Abadan, Iran) is an Iranian-American writer who writes in English. She is the author of the memoirs Funny in Farsi: A Memoir of Growing up Iranian in America (2003) and Laughing without an Accent: Adventures of a Global Citizen (2008), and the semi-autobiographical novel It Ain't so Awful, Falafel (2016).

== Early life ==
At the age of seven, Dumas and her family moved to Whittier, California. She later moved back to Iran and lived in Tehran and Ahvaz. However, she once again immigrated to the United States; first to Whittier, then to Newport Beach, California. She began to write and submit essays to obtain money to go toward college. She attended the University of California, Berkeley where she lived at International House Berkeley and majored in art history.

Kazem, her father, dominates many of her stories throughout her memoir Funny in Farsi: A Memoir of Growing Up Iranian in America. She takes pride in her Iranian heritage, but at the same time, mocks her dad's fascination with "freebies" at Costco and television shows like Bowling for Dollars. Growing up, Dumas struggled to mix with her American classmates, who knew nothing about Iran. She also retells firsthand experiences of prejudice and racism from being Iranian in America during the Iranian Revolution. However, throughout hardships, she emphasizes the significance of family strength and love in her life.

== Career ==
Since the publication of Funny in Farsi, her first book, she has been active on the lecture circuit, speaking at universities, conferences, high schools, middle schools, and other venues. It has sold over half a million copies. It is required reading at many junior highs, high schools, and universities across the country.

Educators have discovered that Firoozeh's novels are a portal to many themes, including shared humanity, immigration, language, family, and identity, despite the fact that pupils are initially drawn in by the humor. Her website provides a free study guide. Many community reading initiatives have had excellent success using Firoozeh's books for citywide reads. Firoozeh's stories appeal to people of all ages and backgrounds, and her humor is well received. She is a writer who enjoys conversing and interacting with others.

Her other work has been published in The New York Times, the Los Angeles Times, The Wall Street Journal, Good Housekeeping, Gourmet and the San Francisco Chronicle. She has also been a commentator for National Public Radio, and a panelist on Wait Wait... Don't Tell Me!.

An attempt was made to adapt Funny in Farsi as a television sitcom by ABC in 2009. A pilot episode, directed by Barry Sonnenfeld and starring Maz Jobrani, was filmed but never aired.

On July 31, 2014, she asked her readers who lived in Iran to purchase the English versions of her books, as the Persian versions not translated by Mohammed Soleimani Nia are unauthorized.

It Ain't So Awful, Falafel, Firoozeh's first historical fiction novel, was published to critical acclaim in 2016 and is now taught in grades 4 through 9 across the United States. It was a Kirkus starred book and a Time magazine Top 10 Young Adult and Children's Book in 2016. It Ain't So Awful, Falafel also won the John and Patricia Beatty Award from the California Library Association in 2017, the New-York Historical Society's 2017 New Americans Children's History Book Prize, the Sunshine State Young Reader Award in 2017, and was a finalist for the California Young Reader Medal.

== Awards and honors ==
As a result of Funny in Farsi's success, Firoozeh Dumas has been nominated for many awards, including the Thurber Prize for American Humor. Not only was she the first Iranian author to be nominated, she was also the first author from Asia to hold such an honor. She lost to Jon Stewart. She was also nominated for an Audie for best audio-book, losing to Bob Dylan. She was nominated for a PEN/USA Award in Creative Nonfiction. She received the Spirit of America Award in 2008 from the National Council for the Social Studies. Former recipients of this award include Jimmy Carter, Rosa Parks, and Mr. Rogers.

== Work ==
- Funny in Farsi: A Memoir of Growing Up Iranian in America (2003)
- Contributing author to My California: Journeys By Great Writers (2004)
- A Vision of Hope Addressing Prejudice and Stereotyping in the Wake of 9/11 (2006)
- Laughing Without an Accent: Adventures of a Global Citizen (2008)
- It Ain't So Awful, Falafel (2016)
