= No One Is Talking About This =

2021 novel by Patricia Lockwood

- First edition cover
- Author: Patricia Lockwood
- Audio read by: Kristen Sieh
- Language: English
- Subject: Internet, grief
- Genre: Literary fiction
- Set in: 21st-century America
- Publisher: Riverhead Books (US); Bloomsbury Circus (UK)
- Publication date: February 16, 2021 (US, UK)
- Publication place: United States; United Kingdom
- Media type: Print, ebook, audiobook, audible
- Pages: 210 pp
- Awards: Dylan Thomas Prize (2022)
- ISBN: 9780593189580 (hardcover US 1st ed.); 9781526629760 (hardcover UK 1st ed.)
- OCLC: 1155693813
- Dewey Decimal: 813.6
- LC Class: PS3612.O27 N6 2021
- Website: No One Is Talking About This at Penguin Random House

No One Is Talking About This is the debut novel by American poet Patricia Lockwood, published in 2021. It was simultaneously released in the United States and United Kingdom via Riverhead and Bloomsbury, respectively. The novel focuses on an unnamed woman engaged with social media full time. Her life changes focus after the birth of her niece.

The novel received critical acclaim and major attention from outlets, magazines, literary journals, and other media upon release. Commentators compared the style, tone, and substance of the novel to that of other writers in the American, Irish and British 20th-century tradition like William Faulkner, James Joyce, Virginia Woolf, and Joan Didion; and the novel was also pronounced a product of Jane Austen's heritage. It became one of the most widely-reviewed and honored books of the year.

It was a finalist for the 2021 Booker Prize, was one of The New York Times' "10 Best Books of 2021", and won the 2022 Dylan Thomas Prize. In 2024, The Atlantic added it as one of 136 books since 1925 to be named a "Great American Novel".

== Overview ==
The book is partitioned into two parts. It follows an unnamed protagonist's interactions with virtual platforms, language, and etiquette, which she calls "the portal". A social media star who became famous for her viral posts like "Can a dog be twins?", she travels the world to meet her fans and is paid to speak about the internet. Much like how Lockwood herself has lectured about internet exposure. This first half "captures a life lived predominantly online with its vapid, mind-numbing, addictive culture"; and then suddenly, her life is upended by the urgency of family emergency.

The novel uses stream of consciousness and other modernist, poetic, and experimental techniques. Its first half does not have a traditional plot. Instead, it is made up of brief, tweet-length increments that seem to have little relation to one another chronologically. In Harper's Magazine, the critic Christian Lorentzen referred to the novel's style as "virtual realism."

The second half, which Lockwood has said is autofictional, presents a family tragedy in which the protagonist's sister's baby is born with a rare disorder. This mirrors real-life events surrounding Lockwood's niece Lena, who was the first person ever diagnosed in utero with Proteus syndrome. The novel proceeds to explore concepts of grief, perception, consciousness, and permanence. The protagonist must deal with the tragedy that unfolds, at the convergence between the real world and the digital.

== Development and publication ==
In 2018 Lockwood delivered a lecture titled "How Do We Write Now?" for Oregon-based publisher Tin House. The essay addressed the effect of internet exposure on the creative process. No One Is Talking About This fleshes out some of the thinking of that essay.

Riverhead Books published No One Is Talking About This in February 2021. It was simultaneously released by Bloomsbury in the UK, where it was the subject of a 10-way auction, and was commissioned for translation in more than a dozen languages. Lockwood composed the novel from 2017, after the publication of her memoir, Priestdaddy, through early 2020, working mostly on an iPhone. The book began as a diary written in the third person. Excerpts appeared in The New Yorker and the London Review of Books.

== Reception ==
=== Comparisons and influence ===
Writing for The New York Review of Books, Clair Wills praised the novel as "an arch descendant of Austen's socio-literary style — a novel of observation, crossed with a memoir of a family crisis, and written as a prose poem, steeped in metaphor." In The Seattle Times Emma Levy compared its structure and narrative style to William Faulkner's The Sound and the Fury, while Molly Young of New York drew parallels to Vladimir Nabokov, "less in style than in attitude, one of extraordinary receptivity to the gifts, sorrows, and bloopers of existence."

"Lockwood has set out to portray not merely a mind through language, as Joyce did," wrote Alexandra Schwartz of The New Yorker, "but what she calls 'the mind,' the molting collective consciousness that has melded with her protagonist's singular one." For the Chicago Tribune, John Warner observed: "She has made a novel out of life, just as Joyce did over a century ago," likening the book favorably to Ulysses.

In a mixed review for the Los Angeles Times, Hillary Kelly wrote that No One Is Talking About This is "either a work of genius or an exasperating endurance trial," comparing it to the novels of Virginia Woolf: "The Waves is masterful, but there's a reason we read Mrs. Dalloway far more." Lockwood's book itself makes direct reference to Woolf's To the Lighthouse, with which it shares a number of aesthetic and ontological concerns.

NPR's Heller McAlpin called it "a tour de force that recalls Joan Didion's ... Slouching Towards Bethlehem."

=== Further assessments ===
Charlotte Goddu of Vanity Fair said: "The feeling one gets from reading No One Is Talking About This is that Lockwood has paid attention more closely than perhaps any other human on earth to what it's like to be alive right now."

Ron Charles of The Washington Post dubbed Lockwood "a master of startling concision when highlighting the absurdities we've grown too lazy to notice" and the book "a vertiginous experience, gorgeously rendered but utterly devastating." In The New York Times, Joumana Khatib wrote that No One Is Talking About This "explores the kind of tumult and grief that almost defies language," while Merve Emre for The New York Times Book Review observed it "transforms all that is ugly and cheap about online culture ... into an experience of sublimity." The Wall Street Journal's Emily Bobrow called the novel "artful" and "an intimate and moving portrait of love and grief." The Boston Globe praised the book's "sublime emotional power."

For The Atlantic, Jordan Kisner found No One Is Talking About This "electric with tenderness" and "a grand success." In Bookforum, Audrey Wollen called it "a stunning record of the hollows and wonders of language itself." The Guardian, The Telegraph, and New Statesman all heralded the book as a "masterpiece."

=== End of year honours and legacy ===
It was included in The New York Times Notable Books of the Year for 2021, a list that encompasses 100 works across a variety formats. Further, The New York Times named it one of the 10 Best Books of 2021. Lockwood is the only writer with both fiction and nonfiction works selected as the 10 Best Books of the Year by The New York Times. Four years earlier, Priestdaddy had been on the 2017 list, so she also holds the record for the shortest span between repeat appearances on the list.

According to at least one holistic, it appeared on more books-of-the-year lists than any other novel of 2021, edging over The Love Songs of W.E.B. Du Bois, Crossroads, and Harlem Shuffle; this included high-profile ones created by The Washington Post, TIME, NPR, The Telegraph, The Times, and The Guardian. Literary Hub's Emily Temple compiled the exhaustive and comprehensive assessment of critic attitudes towards literature from 2021, calling it an "Ultimate Best Books of 2021 List"; she determined that altogether 19 mainstream magazines and outlets explicitly named the book as a critical or important work of the year on their own platforms. It tied Patrick Radden Keefe's Empire of Pain: The Secret History of the Sackler Dynasty for the most notoriety out of any work from the year based on this criterion.

In 2024, The Atlantic included No One Is Talking About This among its list of Great American Novels, comprising 136 novels since 1925, from The Great Gatsby to contemporary peers such as A Brief History of Seven Killings and Lost Children Archive.

In a similar appraisal in 2026, Vox's Constance Grady wrote: "Lockwood turns the experience of being extremely online in the late 2010s into a Joycean stream-of-consciousness parable, with ravishing, extraordinary sentences."

== Awards ==
No One Is Talking About This won the 2022 Dylan Thomas Prize and was a finalist for other major awards, including the Booker Prize and the Women's Prize for Fiction.

The Booker Prize Foundation, in justifying the shortlist selection, called it a "sincere and delightfully profane love letter to the infinite scroll, and a meditation on love, language and human connection." In individual comments, "The book’s triumph is in evoking so full a range of emotional discovery and maturing within the unpromising medium of online prattle," said Booker judge Rowan Williams. "We’re left wondering about the processes by which language expands to cope with the expansiveness of changing human relations and perceptions at the edge of extremity."

Year	Award	Category	Result	Ref.
2021	Booker Prize	—	Shortlisted	
2021	Center for Fiction First Novel Prize	—	Shortlisted	
2021	Women's Prize for Fiction	—	Shortlisted	
2022	Dylan Thomas Prize	—	Won	
2022	International Dublin Literary Award	—	Longlisted	
