= Julie Schumacher =

American novelist, essayist and short story writer

- Born: Wilmington, Delaware, United States
- Occupations: Novelist, essayist, short story writer, academic
- Spouse: Lawrence R. Jacobs
- Children: 2
- Awards: Thurber Prize for American Humor; Rockefeller Foundation Bellagio Center Fellowship; The Loft Literary Center Loft-McKnight Award in Creative Prose

Academic background
- Education: Oberlin College (B.A., 1981); Cornell University (M.F.A., 1986)

Academic work
- Institutions: University of Minnesota
- Website: julieschumacher.com

Julie Schumacher is an American novelist, essayist, short story writer, and academic. She is a Regents Professor of English at the University of Minnesota. Schumacher specializes in creative writing, contemporary fiction, and children's literature.

== Education ==
Schumacher received her bachelor's degree in Spanish and Latin American studies from Oberlin College in 1981. She earned her Master of Fine Arts degree from Cornell University in 1986.

== Career ==
Following her MFA, Schumacher was an assistant professor at St. Olaf College and other academic institutions before joining the faculty at the University of Minnesota as an associate professor in 1996. She was promoted to professor in 2008, and became Regents Professor in 2021. She has won multiple teaching awards and served as director of the MFA Creative Writing Program at the University of Minnesota for thirteen years.

== Works ==
Schumacher has authored multiple novels, stories, and essays. Her first novel, The Body Is Water, was an ALA Notable Book of the Year and a finalist for the PEN/Hemingway Award for Debut Novel. Her other books include An Explanation for Chaos and five books for young readers: The Unbearable Book Club for Unsinkable Girls, The Chain Letter, Black Box, The Book of One Hundred Truths, and Grass Angel.

Schumacher is also the author of the national best-selling epistolary novel, Dear Committee Members, for which she was awarded the Thurber Prize for American Humor. She was the first woman to win the Thurber Prize. An NPR review noted that the novel "deftly mixes comedy with social criticism and righteous outrage."

In 2018, Schumacher published The Shakespeare Requirement, which Kirkus Reviews called a "satire that oscillates between genuine compassion and scathing mockery with admirable dexterity." The New Yorker described the novel as a "sad-professor satire that burns with moral anger."

== Awards and honors ==
- 1995 - PEN/Hemingway Award for Debut Novel finalist, The Body Is Water
- 1995 - ALA Notable Book of the Year, The Body Is Water
- 2000 - Loft McKnight Award in Creative Prose
- 2007 - Minnesota Book Award in Young Adult Literature, The Book of One Hundred Truths
- 2008 - University of Minnesota College of Continuing Education Distinguished Educator Award
- 2010 - University of Minnesota Horace T. Morse-Minnesota Alumni Association Award for Outstanding Contributions to Undergraduate Education
- 2011 - Rockefeller Foundation Bellagio Residency
- 2015 - Thurber Prize for American Humor
- 2016 - University of Minnesota College of Liberal Arts Scholar of the College
- 2019 - University of Minnesota Award for Outstanding Contributions to Graduate and Professional Education
- 2021 - University of Minnesota Regents Professorship

== Bibliography ==
=== Books ===
- The Body is Water (1995) ISBN 978-1-56947-042-8
- An Explanation for Chaos (1998) ISBN 978-0-380-73050-6
- Grass Angel (2004) ISBN 978-0-385-73073-0
- The Chain Letter (2005) ISBN 978-0-385-73169-0
- The Book of One Hundred Truths (2006) ISBN 978-0-385-73290-1
- Black Box (2008) ISBN 978-0-385-73542-1
- The Unbearable Book Club for Unsinkable Girls (2012) ISBN 978-0-385-73773-9
- Dear Committee Members (2014) ISBN 978-0-345-80733-5
- Doodling for Academics: A Coloring and Activity Book (2017) ISBN 978-0-226-46704-7
- The Shakespeare Requirement (2018) ISBN 978-0-385-54234-0
- The English Experience (2023) ISBN 978-0-385-55012-3

=== Selected articles ===
- “Was This Student Dangerous?”, The New York Times, June 18, 2014
- “What My Mother Wanted Us to Pack”, The New York Times, November 8, 2015
- “I Married a Pundit”, Minnesota Alumni, Fall 2018.

== Personal life ==
Schumacher is married to Lawrence R. Jacobs, a political scientist who is the Walter F. and Joan Mondale Chair for Political Studies and Director of the Center for the Study of Politics and Governance at the University of Minnesota. They met in an English class during their first year at Oberlin College.

They have two adult daughters, Emma and Isabella.
