= Dan Wasserman =

American political cartoonist

Dan Wasserman is an American political cartoonist for The Boston Globe. Wasserman joined the Globe in 1985. He is syndicated by Tribune Content Agency in 40 papers in the U.S., Latin America, and Europe, and is the author of two books, We've Been Framed and Paper Cuts. Wasserman has a BA from Swarthmore College and studied at The Art Students League of New York.
