= Journal of Health Politics, Policy and Law =

- Discipline: Health policy, health law
- Language: English
- Edited by: Jonathan Oberlander

Publication details
- History: 1976–present
- Publisher: Duke University Press (United States)
- Frequency: Bimonthly
- Impact factor: 2.977 (2021)

Standard abbreviations
- Bluebook: J. Health Pol. Pol'y & L.
- ISO 4: J. Health Politics Policy Law

Indexing
- CODEN: JHPLDN
- ISSN: 0361-6878 (print); 1527-1927 (web)
- LCCN: 76646971
- OCLC no.: 2115780

Links
- Journal homepage; Online archive

The Journal of Health Politics, Policy and Law is a bimonthly peer-reviewed academic journal covering health policy and health law as they relate to politics. It was established in 1976 and is published by Duke University Press. The editor-in-chief is Jonathan Oberlander (University of North Carolina, Chapel Hill). According to the Journal Citation Reports, the journal had a 2021 impact factor of 2.977.
