= I Was Told There'd Be Cake =

2008 collection of essays by Sloane Crosley

- Author: Sloane Crosley
- Language: English
- Genre: Nonfiction
- Publisher: Riverhead Books
- Publication place: United States
- Media type: Print
- ISBN: 9781436207126

I Was Told There'd Be Cake is a 2008 collection of essays by American writer and literary publicist Sloane Crosley. It was a New York Times best seller.

== Reception ==
American author Jonathan Lethem called Crosley "another mordant and mercurial wit from the realm of Sedaris and Vowell." David Sedaris called her writing "sure-footed, observant and relentlessly funny."

Kirkus Reviews called the book "witty and entertaining".

The Seattle Times said "this book about nothing is riveting to the very end".

The New York Observer described it as "a funny book, and also a wistful book and a touching book".

A San Francisco Chronicle reviewer noted that while the book featured "sharp, self-effacing humor", the book's style reveals the author as "too clever for her own good" and "not... very, well, nice", though that by the book's end, "we forgive her deceptions".
