= Gabe Hudson =

American writer (born 1971)

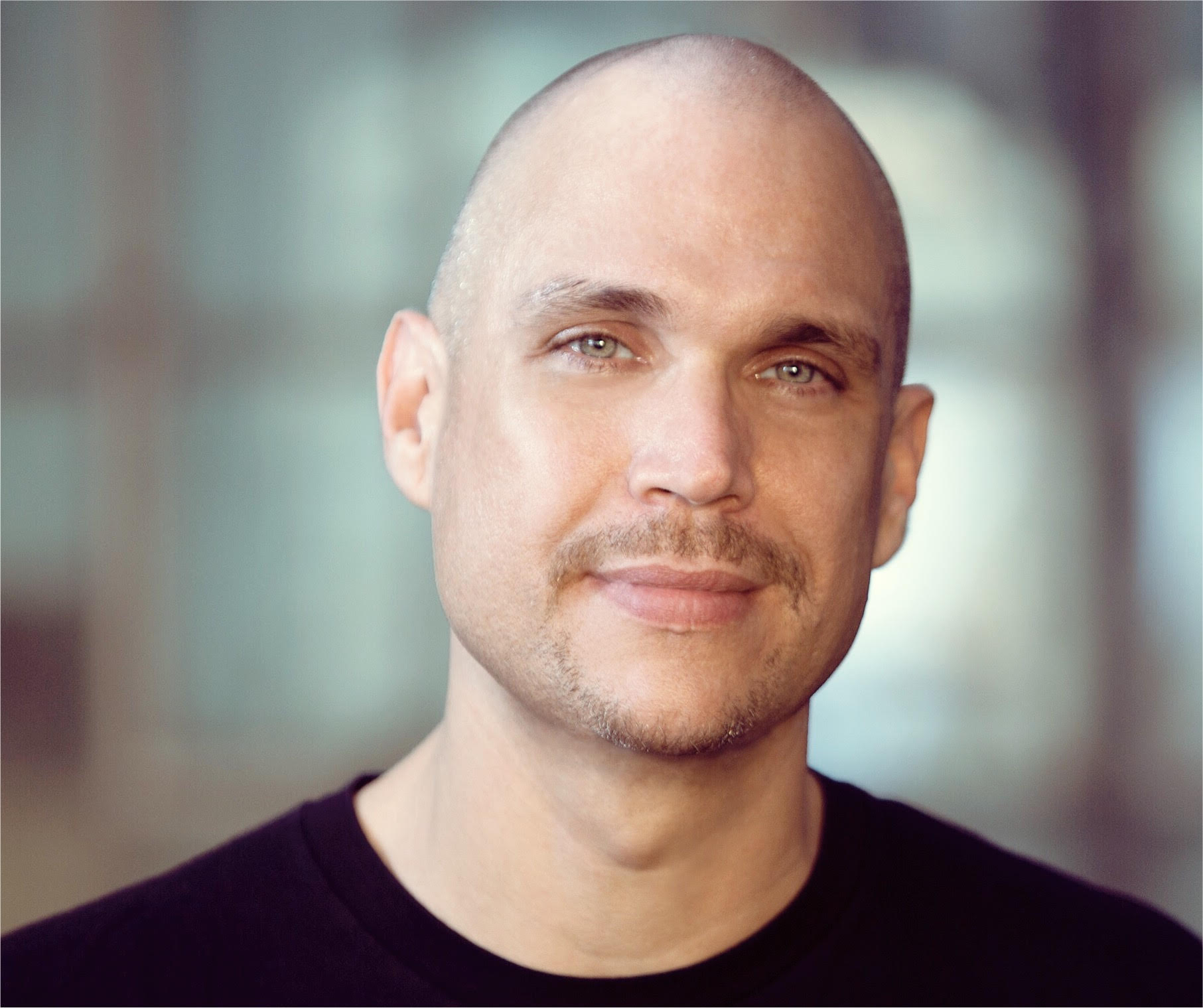
- Hudson in Brooklyn, 2015
- Born: September 12, 1971; Muncie, Indiana, U.S.
- Died: November 23, 2023 (aged 52); Massachusetts, U.S.
- Occupation: Novelist
- Education: University of Texas, Austin (BA); Brown University (MFA)

Website
- Official website

Gabriel George Hudson (September 12, 1971 — November 23, 2023) was an American writer. His novel Gork, the Teenage Dragon was released by Knopf on July 11, 2017. Hudson's first book of fiction, Dear Mr. President (Knopf, 2002), has been translated into seven languages, was a PEN/Hemingway Award finalist, and received the Alfred Hodder Fellowship from Princeton University, and the Sue Kaufman Prize for First Fiction from the American Academy of Arts and Letters.

== Life ==
Hudson served as a rifleman in the Marine Corps Reserve, and held a Master of Fine Arts from Brown University, where he received the top graduate creative writing award, The John Hawkes Prize in Fiction.

Hudson died in Massachusetts on November 23, 2023 from complications of diabetes and kidney disease.

== Work ==
Hudson's story collection Dear Mr. President was chosen as one of the Ten Best Books of the Year by GQ, as well as a Best Book of the Year by The St. Louis Post-Dispatch and The Village Voice, and a New & Noteworthy Paperback by The New York Times. It is considered to be "the first significant piece of Gulf-war fiction" according to Esquire.

Previously Hudson was Chair of the Creative Writing Program at Yonsei University's Underwood International College. Before Yonsei University, he taught in the Creative Writing Program at Princeton University from 2004-2007.

== Publications ==
Hudson's writing has appeared in The New Yorker, The Village Voice, McSweeney's, BlackBook, Granta, Columbia: A Journal of Literature and Art, the International Herald Tribune, and The New York Times Magazine.

Hudson was a contributing writer for HBO's book, "Six Feet Under: Better Living Through Death" (2004). He was an editor-at-large for McSweeney's.

In 2007, he was selected as one of the "Twenty Best Young American Novelists" by Granta Magazine.
