= Sloane Crosley =

American writer (born 1979)

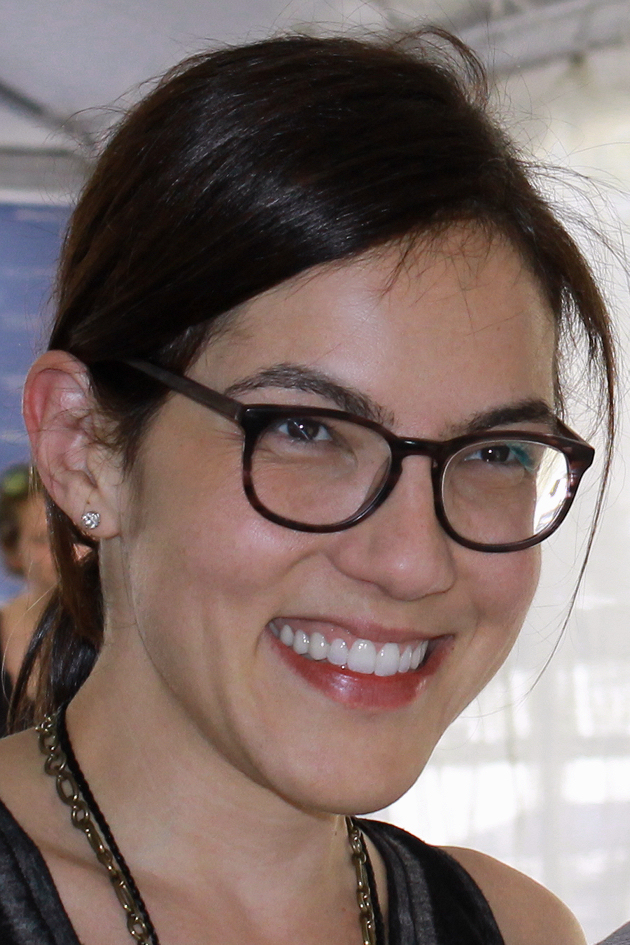
- Crosley at the 2015 Texas Book Festival.
- Born: August 3, 1978 (age 48); New York City, U.S.
- Education: Connecticut College (BA)
- Occupations: Journalist; essayist; novelist
- Writing career
- Subjects: Nonfiction, fiction
- Website: www.sloanecrosley.com

Sloane Crosley (born August 3, 1978) is an American writer living in New York City known for her humorous essays, which are often collected into books like I Was Told There'd Be Cake, How Did You Get This Number, and Look Alive Out There.

She has also worked as a publicist at the Vintage Books division of Random House and as an adjunct professor in Columbia University's Master of Fine Arts program.

Her recent work includes a novel Cult Classic (2022) and her memoir Grief Is for People (2024), largely about the death of her friend Russell Perreault.

== Education ==
Crosley graduated from Connecticut College in 2000.

== Career ==
Riverhead Books published Crosley's first collection of essays I Was Told There'd Be Cake on April 1, 2008. The book appeared on The New York Times Best Seller list. It was a finalist for the Thurber Prize for American Humor, one of Amazon's best books of the year, and optioned by HBO. Crosley's second collection of essays, the 2010 book How Did You Get This Number, also appeared on The New York Times Best Seller list. Farrar, Straus and Giroux released her debut novel The Clasp in October 2015; it was optioned by Universal Pictures in 2016. Her third book of essays Look Alive Out There was also a Thurber Prize finalist. Crosley's second novel, Cult Classic, was published in 2022. In addition to writing her own books, Crosley edited The Best American Travel Writing in 2011.

Crosley has published work in or edited for various magazines and newspapers. She was a weekly columnist for British newspaper The Independent in 2011. She is a contributing editor at Vanity Fair and was the founding columnist for The New York Times "Townies" op-ed series, a columnist for The New York Observer Diary, a columnist for The Village Voice, a contributing editor at BlackBook and is a regular contributor to The New York Times, GQ, Elle, and NPR. She has also written cover stories and features for Salon.com, Spin, Vogue, Esquire, Playboy, W, and Afar. She co-wrote the song "It Only Gets Much Worse" with Nate Ruess.

Crosley's 2024 memoir Grief Is for People is her first full-length nonfiction book and was published to positive reviews. It focuses largely on the death of close friend Russell Perreault, Vice President of Vintage Books.

Crosley is co-chair of the New York Public Library's Young Lions Committee and serves on the board of Housingworks Bookstore.

== In popular culture ==
In 2011 Crosley appeared on the TV series Gossip Girl as herself. She appeared on The Late Late Show with Craig Ferguson on six occasions from 2010 to 2014.

She was mentioned in BoJack Horseman when the character Diane Nguyen receives an advance for a book of personal essays. On July 4, 2022, she was a clue on Jeopardy!

== Bibliography ==
=== Story and essay collections ===
- I Was Told There'd Be Cake. New York: Riverhead Books. 2008. ISBN 978-1436207126.
- How Did You Get This Number. New York: Riverhead Books. 2010. ISBN 978-1594487590.
- Look Alive Out There. New York: Farrar, Straus and Giroux. 2018. ISBN 978-0374279844.

=== Memoirs ===
- Grief Is for People. New York: MCD. 2024. ISBN 978-0374609849.

=== Novels ===
- The Clasp. New York: Farrar, Straus and Giroux. 2015. ISBN 978-0374124410.
- Cult Classic. New York: MCD. 2022. ISBN 978-0374603397.
