= Underwood International College =

Department of Yonsei University, South Korea

Underwood International College, Yonsei University
- 언더우드국제대학 (hangeul) 언더우드國際大學 (hanja)
- Motto: 진리가 너희를 자유케 하리라 (요한복음 8:32) (Korean)
- Motto in English: The truth will set you free (John 8:32)
- Type: Private, Undergraduate
- Established: 2005
- Parent institution: Yonsei University
- Religious affiliation: Christian (Protestant)
- Dean: John M. Frankl
- Academic staff: 97
- Administrative staff: 13
- Location: Seoul and Incheon, South Korea
- Campus: Urban 250 acres (Sinchon Campus) 152 acres (Int'l Campus)
- Colours: Royal blue
- Mascot: Eagle
- Website: uic.yonsei.ac.kr

Underwood International College, Yonsei University was founded in 2005 as a constituent college of Yonsei University. Based in Seoul and Incheon, South Korea.

The college is the first liberal arts college in the Republic of Korea, and the only college at Yonsei University to conduct and assess all classes in English. It has small classes taught by approximately 100 Korean and international faculty, many who hold undergraduate and/or graduate degrees from western institutions, such as Ivy League and Oxbridge universities. For the Class of 2020, the college received 2,637 applications for 416 student places across three academic divisions — an acceptance rate of 15.78%. The number of applications and student spots have continued to rise steadily since 2015.

== History ==
Underwood International College, Yonsei University accepted its inaugural class in March 2006. Its first dean was Professor Jongryn Mo. Earlier, in October 2004, the President of Yonsei University had appointed Mo as Chairman of the "University Committee for New International College", and Mo contributed significantly to the early development of the institution.

The college first began with just five majors: Comparative Literature and Culture, Economics, International Studies, Political Science and International Relations, and Life Science and Biotechnology. These five original majors are housed under what is now known as the Underwood Division. In 2012, Underwood International College added the Asian Studies Division as well as four new majors under the Techno-Art Division. In combination with the Integrated Social Sciences Division, which was established in 2014, these three divisions compose the comprehensive and interdisciplinary Humanities and Social Sciences (HASS) Field. Finally, 2014 also saw the introduction of the Integrated Science & Engineering Division, which includes the following three STEM majors: Nano Science and Engineering, Energy and Environmental Science and Engineering, and Bio-Convergence.

Since its inauguration, not only has the college experienced growth in the size of its community, but it has also increased its number of programs offered to the students, including the annual Global Career Tour and Global Research Competition.

== Academic Partnerships and Exchange Programs ==
UIC maintains collegial ties with Dartmouth College in Hanover, New Hampshire. As of 2013, it has signed exchange partnerships with institutions such as Barnard College (Columbia University), Waseda University, University of California, Berkeley Department of Economics, University of Geneva, and University College Utrecht.

One of UIC's first exchange programs was the "Three-Campus Comparative East Asian Program." It commenced in 2008 in collaboration with University of Hong Kong and Keio University in Japan. The program allows UIC students to take a year of study across the three campuses. Another example of a program only offered to UIC students is hosted at Amherst College in Amherst, Massachusetts. The two schools signed a MoU partnership agreement in 2019 to host a semester-based bilateral exchange program.

== Controversies ==
=== Expansion to Yonsei International Campus ===
In 2011, the main base of UIC was moved from Seoul to Incheon despite the opposition from students and the faculty. According to a Korea Times article, most students opposed the school’s decision to move the campus. However, students who have experienced residential college life at Songdo campus have been satisfied with their experience and rate the academic environment at Songdo Global Campus quite highly, although they do mention that maintaining relationships with people from other grades, who may be at the Sinchon campus, are challenging.

=== Quality of education ===
In the Fall 2017 semester, UIC's student newsletter Scribe released an article discussing student dissatisfaction with the academic curriculum. A post on the College of Economics and Commerce Student Council's Facebook page announced that the department would eliminate five major courses. Of the five closed courses, four were taught in English and offered as major electives to UIC students. Because priority registration was given to the non-UIC Economics students, many UIC students were left questioning the accessibility to major courses. Secondly, the Scribe article observed the lack of full-time faculty as well as the English skills of certain lecturers, two factors that have led to the criticism that UIC is "a stilted, substandard version of the intellectually engaging and challenging academic scene the college promotes." Thirdly, UIC's expensive tuition, in comparison to other Korean universities, has made many students "feel they pay double tuition for only a half's-education."

=== Representation in the student body ===
According to a 2017 Yonsei Annals article titled "Underwood International College (UIC)'s Identity Crisis," underrepresentation of international students has been a problem since the college was founded in 2005. The students believed that the problem was exacerbated by the lack of an international student representative in the official UIC Student Congress. This raised concerns that UIC was advertised as a global learning environment despite the dissatisfaction felt by the members of its international community. However, taking this feedback into account, each UIC Student Congress since 2017 has included at least two international student representatives. Also, SAM, the official UIC Student Ambassadors, is composed mostly of international students.

== Bibliography ==
- Kim, Stephanie K. (January 20, 2016). "Western faculty 'flight risk' at a Korean university and the complexities of internationalisation in Asian higher education". Comparative Education. 52 (1): 78–90. doi:10.1080/03050068.2015.1125620. S2CID 146923668.
