= Harrison Scott Key =

American author

Harrison Scott Key is an American author. His book The World’s Largest Man won the 2016 Thurber Prize for American Humor.

== Books ==
- The World's Largest Man (Harper, 2015)
- Congratulations, Who Are You Again? (Harper Perennial, 2018)
- How to Stay Married: The Most Insane Love Story Ever Told (Avid Reader Press/Simon & Schuster, 2023)
