= Roz Chast =

American cartoonist (born 1954)

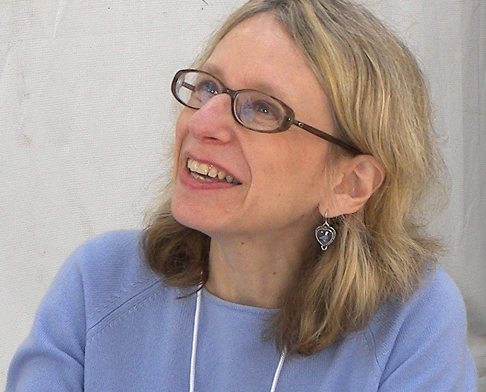
- Chast in 2007
- Born: November 26, 1954 (age 71) Brooklyn, New York, U.S.
- Area: Cartoonist
- Awards: Harvey Award Hall of Fame; National Humanities Medal
- Spouse: Bill Franzen

Roz Chast (born November 26, 1954) is an American cartoonist and a staff cartoonist for The New Yorker. Since 1978, she has published more than 1000 cartoons in The New Yorker. She also publishes cartoons in Scientific American and the Harvard Business Review.

In recognition of her work, ComicsAlliance listed Chast as one of twelve women cartoonists deserving of lifetime achievement recognition. She was elected to the American Philosophical Society in 2010. In May 2017, she received the Alumni Award for Artistic Achievement at the Rhode Island School of Design commencement ceremony. In 2024, Chast was awarded a National Humanities Medal by President Joe Biden.

== Early life and education ==
Chast grew up in the Flatbush section of Brooklyn, the only child of George Chast, a high school French and Spanish teacher, and Elizabeth, an assistant principal in an elementary school. Her Jewish parents were children during the Great Depression, and she has spoken about their extreme frugality. She graduated from Midwood High School in Brooklyn, and attended Kirkland College (which later merged with Hamilton College). She studied at the Rhode Island School of Design and received a BFA in painting in 1977. She also holds honorary doctorates from Pratt Institute, Dartmouth College, and the Art Institute of Boston at Lesley University; and is a member of the American Academy of Arts and Sciences.

== Career ==
Chast's subjects often deal with domestic and family life. In a 2006 interview with comedian Steve Martin for the New Yorker Festival, Chast expressed that she enjoys drawing interior scenes, often involving lamps and accentuated wallpaper, to serve as the backdrop for her comics. Her comics reflect a "conspiracy of inanimate objects", an expression she credits to her mother.

Her first New Yorker cartoon, Little Things, was sold to the magazine in April 1978. The cartoon, which Chast describes as "peculiar and personal", shows a small collection of "Little Things"—strangely named, oddly shaped small objects such as "chent", "spak", and "tiv".

Her New Yorker cartoons began as small black-and-white panels, but increasingly used more color and often appeared over several pages. Her first cover for The New Yorker was the August 4, 1986 issue.

Chast has written or illustrated more than a dozen books, including Unscientific Americans, Parallel Universes, Mondo Boxo, Proof of Life on Earth, The Four Elements and The Party After You Left: Collected Cartoons 1995–2003 (Bloomsbury, 2004). In 2006, Theories of Everything: Selected Collected and Health-Inspected Cartoons, 1978–2006 was published, collecting most of her cartoons from The New Yorker and other periodicals. One characteristic of her books is that the "author photo" is always a cartoon she draws of, presumably, herself. The title page, including the Library of Congress cataloging information, is also hand-lettered by Chast.

Her book, Can't We Talk About Something More Pleasant? is a graphic memoir, combining cartoons, text, and photographs to tell the story of an only child helping her elderly parents navigate the end of their lives.

On October 30, 2024, Chast was awarded a National Humanities Medal by the National Endowment for the Humanities for "deepen[ing] the nation's understanding of the humanities and broad[ening] our citizens' engagement with history, literature, languages, philosophy, and other humanities subjects". President Joe Biden presented the medal to Chast.

== Personal life ==
Chast lives in Ridgefield, Connecticut with her husband, humor writer Bill Franzen. They have two children.

== Exhibitions ==
- "The Masters Series: Roz Chast" at School of Visual Arts in New York City (2018)
- "Cartoon Memoirs" at the Contemporary Jewish Museum (2017)
- "Cartoon Memoirs" at the Museum of the City of New York (2016)
- "Cartoon Memoirs" at the Norman Rockwell Museum (2015)

== Awards ==
- 2024 National Humanities Medal
- 2012 NYC Literary Honor in Humor
- 2013 Inducted, American Academy of Arts and Sciences
- 2014 Kirkus Prize winner for Can't We Talk About Something More Pleasant?
- 2014 National Book Critics Circle Award (Autobiography) winner for Can't We Talk About Something More Pleasant?
- 2015 Reuben Award, Cartoonist of the Year National Cartoonists Society
- 2015 20th Annual Heinz Award for the Arts and Humanities
- 2018 Harvey Award Hall of Fame inductee

== Bibliography ==
=== Articles and comic strips ===
- Chast, Roz (November 8, 2010). "Leo Cullum". The Talk of the Town. Postscript. The New Yorker. 86 (35): 30.
- — (November 8, 2010). "Bananas". Shouts & Murmurs. The New Yorker. 86 (35): 40.
- — (July 20, 2015). "Back-yard bird talk". Shouts & Murmurs. The New Yorker. 91 (20): 29.
- — (July 25, 2016). "Epilogue". Sketchbook. The New Yorker. 92 (22): 44–45. (Note: Online version is titled "Epilogue : time to say goodbye".)
- — (December 28, 2020). "A cartoonist's life". Comics. The New Yorker. 96 (42): 33. (Note: Title in the online table of contents is "The cartoonist as junior-high student".)
- — (June 21, 2021). "Father's Day". Sketchbook. The New Yorker. 97 (17): 63. (Note: Online version is titled "A Coney Island Father’s Day memory".)
- — (September 12, 2022). "Food 'poems'". Sketchbook. The New Yorker. 98 (28): 39. (Note: Online version is titled "A few food 'poems'".)

=== Books ===
- Chast, Roz (1979). Last resorts. New York City: Ink Inc.
- — (1982). Unscientific Americans. Dial.
- — (1982). Three small books. New York: Kathryn Markel.
- — (1984). Parallel universes : cartoons. Harper.
- — (1985). Poems and songs. Ink Inc.
- Mondo Boxo (Harper, 1987) ISBN 9780060157951
- The Four Elements (Harper, 1988) ISBN 9780708847817
- Proof of Life on Earth (Harper, 1991) ISBN 9780060968861
- Childproof (Hyperion, 1997) ISBN 9780786862443
- The Party, After You Left (Bloomsbury, 2004) ISBN 9781632861078
- Theories of Everything: Selected, Collected, and Health-Inspected Cartoons, 1978-2006 (Bloomsbury, 2008) ISBN 9781596915404
- Too Busy Marco (Atheneum, 2010) ISBN 9781442440708
- What I Hate: From A to Z (Bloomsbury, 2011) ISBN 9781608196890
- A Friend for Marco (Atheneum, 2012) ISBN 9781416984757
- Marco Goes to School (Atheneum, 2012) ISBN 9781416984757
- Can't We Talk About Something More Pleasant? (Bloomsbury, 2014) ISBN 9781608198061
- Roz Chast: Cartoon Memoirs (Norman Rockwell Museum, 2015)
- Around the Clock (Atheneum, 2015) ISBN 9781416984764
- The Best American Comics 2016 (editor) (Houghton Mifflin Harcourt, 2016) ISBN 9780544750357
- Going Into Town: A Love Letter to New York (Bloomsbury, 2017) ISBN 9781632869784
- Marx, Patricia. You Can Only Yell at Me for One Thing at a Time (illustrated by Roz Chast), (New York: Celadon Books, 2020)
- I Must Be Dreaming (Bloomsbury, 2023) ISBN 9781620403228

———————
