= Priestdaddy =

2017 memoir by Patricia Lockwood

- First edition
- Author: Patricia Lockwood
- Language: English
- Subject: Family, Catholicism
- Genre: Memoir, humor
- Publisher: Riverhead Books
- Publication date: May 2, 2017
- Publication place: United States
- Media type: Print
- Pages: 352 pp
- ISBN: 9781594633737 (hardcover)
- OCLC: 956775305
- Dewey Decimal: 811.6 B
- LC Class: PS3612.O27 Z46 2017
- Website: Priestdaddy at Penguin Random House

Priestdaddy is a memoir by American poet Patricia Lockwood. It was named one of the 10 best books of 2017 by The New York Times and was awarded the 2018 Thurber Prize for American Humor. In 2019, The New York Times included the book on its list "The 50 Best Memoirs of the Past 50 Years," and The Guardian named it one of the 100 best books of the 21st century.

== Development and publication history ==
Lockwood began writing the book shortly after she and her husband, owing to financial difficulty and illness, moved back to live with her parents in her father's rectory. The 352-page memoir was published May 2, 2017 by the Riverhead Books imprint of Penguin Random House. In July 2017, Imagine Entertainment announced it had optioned Priestdaddy for development as a limited TV series.

== Content and style ==
In Priestdaddy, Lockwood recounts her upbringing as the daughter of a married Lutheran minister who converted to Catholicism, becoming one of the few married Roman Catholic priests. The book chronicles her return as an adult to live in her father's rectory and deals with issues of family, belief, belonging, and adulthood. Writing in Chicago Tribune, Kathleen Rooney described Priestdaddy as "an unsparing yet ultimately affectionate portrait of faith and family." The Guardian called it a "dazzling comic memoir."

== Reception ==
Priestdaddy was reviewed widely and favorably, with particular praise for Lockwood's wit and the "pleasure in her line-by-line writing; the author can describe even a seminarian’s ordination ceremony in a colorful, unexpected way, her prose dyed with bizarre sexuality, religious eroticism, and slapstick timing" (Laura Adamczyk writing at The A.V. Club).

Rooney likewise said Lockwood's book displayed "the same offbeat intelligence, comic timing, gimlet skill for observation and verbal dexterity that she uses in both her poetry and her tweets." In The New York Times, Dwight Garner called Priestdaddy "electric," "consistently alive with feeling," and Lockwood's father Greg "one of the great characters of this nonfiction decade." Writing for Playboy, James Yeh dubbed it "a powerful true story from one of America’s most relevant and funniest writers," The New Yorker praised the book as "a vivid, unrelentingly funny memoir ... shot through with surprises and revelations," and The Atlantic lauded it as "a deliciously old-school, big-R Romantic endeavor." Gemma Sieff, writing for The New York Times Book Review, concluded the memoir positioned Lockwood as "a formidably gifted writer who can do pretty much anything she pleases."

Priestdaddy was named one of the 10 best books of 2017 by The New York Times, one of the best books of the year by The Washington Post, The Boston Globe, Chicago Tribune, The Sunday Times, The Guardian, The New Yorker, The Atlantic, New York, Elle, NPR, Amazon, and Publishers Weekly, among others. Lithub's Emily Temple compiled an exhaustive and comprehensive assessment of critic attitudes towards literature from 2017 calling it an "Ultimate Best Books of 2017 List"; she determined that altogether 13 mainstream magazines and outlets explicitly named the memoir as a critical or important work of the year on their own platforms.

== Awards ==
Priestdaddy was shortlisted for the Kirkus Prize and won the 2018 Thurber Prize for American Humor.

Year	Award	Category	Result	Ref.
2017	Goodreads Choice Award	Best Memoir & Autobiography	Nominated—20th	
2017	Kirkus Prize	—	Shortlisted	
2018	Thurber Prize for American Humor	—	Won	
