= State by State =

Book; collection of pieces about the United States

State by State: A Panoramic Portrait of America
- First edition
- Author: Matt Weiland and Sean Wilsey, eds.
- Language: English
- Genre: Non-fiction
- Publisher: HarperCollins
- Publication date: 2008
- Media type: Print (hardcover, paperback)
- ISBN: 978-0-06-147090-5

State by State: A Panoramic Portrait of America is a collection of pieces about the United States, with one essay on each of the fifty states. It was conceived of and edited by Matt Weiland and Sean Wilsey.

== Background ==
Weiland and Wilsey stated that they were inspired by the Federal Writers' Project of the 1930s, in which the US government helped to create jobs by sending writers across the country and commissioning pieces on their sights and experiences. The two previously edited Thinking Fan's Guide to the World Cup, in which they commissioned 32 authors to write pieces on the 32 countries competing in the 2006 World Cup; they decided a similar approach could be taken with the United States.

Both Weiland and Wilsey decided that they wanted a mixture of approaches for the collection; while several well-known authors (e.g., Ha Jin, Jhumpa Lahiri, Dave Eggers) were included, they deliberately avoided certain authors that were closely associated with a particular state - for instance, Garrison Keillor with Minnesota, or Carl Hiaasen with Florida. The collection has a mix of familiarity, with some authors writing about places in which they have lived their entire lives, while others visited the state for the first time.

== Editing process ==
Editors Matt Weiland and Sean Wilsey both agree that they were heavy, interactive editors. "I mean no dishonor to any of the writers to say that we worked very closely with them all to revise as much as possible, to make every piece as lasting and solid and convincing as possible," Weiland told Bookslut. "And I take great pride in that kind of work. I've done it on The Baffler and on Granta and now at The Paris Review. And to Sean, likewise, that means a lot to him—he did it at The New Yorker and continues to do it for McSweeney's....I think [the writers] saw very quickly we wanted to make a book that would still be read decades from now...and that meant...not even taking their A-minus work, but pushing them for their absolute best." Each essay, Weiland said, went through at least six rounds of edits.

== Editorial point of view ==
Weiland told Bookslut that State by State had served for both its editors as "a kind of reminder of the many things we [as Americans] have to be confident about.... Despite many reasons not to feel optimistic, chiefly during the last eight years of the Bush administration—deep down, I think we’re all right." Wilsey told Brooklyn Rail that he was sorry the late David Foster Wallace had declined to be in the book: "Nobody gets at what makes America the extravagantly sad country it is like Wallace did." Asked whether he hates any states, Wilsey replied, "I hate Maine. I hate New England. It's so claustrophobic, no vistas, the landscape is constantly choking you. The people in New England just don't seem kind; they're all hardened and beaten down by the harsh winters. As a Californian, you're not always kind, but you're always nice, and within the framework of niceness you can either be mellow or stoked. I'm a stoked Californian. New England somehow flattens that. Granted, I went to boarding school there for three years, and those were some of the worst years of my life, so that's probably a big part of my dislike for it."

== Presentation to Barack Obama ==
As he documented in an essay for The Guardian, Sean Wilsey personally presented a copy of State by State to Barack Obama in late 2008. Wilsey was invited to attend an event after donating his portion of the advance for the book to Obama's campaign. "When he turned to shake my hand, for some reason I chose to address him by his first name, saying, 'Barack, I brought you this book.'" Six photographs were taken of the handover. "As I handed it to him I was thinking we, all of us, did this for you. I think you can see that in the [accompanying] picture." Obama was very interested in the book and began reading it in front of Wilsey.

== Distribution to schools and related coverage ==
Select institutions received complimentary copies of State by State. Many educators received the book with respectful interest and enthusiasm. On the website The Millions, a teacher asked whether he should assign the book in his 21st century literature class. It was one of four tomes he was considering; the others were "[Charles] Bock's Beautiful Children, [Joshua] Ferris' Then We Came to the End, and Brock Clarke's An Arsonist's Guide to Writers' Homes in New England. "My students are really intelligent, and so just about anything is fair game." Millions contributor Edan Lepucki responded, "Of the four you're considering teaching, I think State by State is the best, since it showcases so many great writers. While I enjoyed Joshua Ferris's Then We Came to the End, I think a workplace narrative would be lost on most teenagers."

Professor Tyler Cowen, on the site Marginal Revolution: Small Steps to a Much Better World, noted that he was thinking of assigning State by State to his graduate students at Berlin's Freie Universität along with Alexis de Tocqueville's Democracy in America.

Manhattan's progressive Calhoun School used State by State for its Upper School students in 2012 as required summer reading. The school assigned fifteen essays, two of which are graphic essays, or comic strips. "There's interesting material in every essay and we are certain that this book will spark a wide variety of interesting conversations between students, teachers and parents," the school noted on its website.

Matt Weiland and two of his writers were hosted by a Milwaukee high school for a reading at an assembly. "I wasn't sure what high school students would make of it, but we were careful to select the pieces with the most drinking and the most sex," Weiland told Bookslut. Columbia, the alumni magazine of Columbia University, of which Weiland is a graduate, profiled him in an article called "This Land Is Weiland" and praised him as "a consummate intellectual".

== Reception ==
State by State was widely reviewed. The New York Times Book Review expressed that it was "greater than the sum of its excellent parts," while the Boston Globe concluded similarly it was "impressive," and Salon pronounced that the book would provide "ideal nightstand reading." To The New York Observer the anthology was also greater than its parts, heralding "a sign of progress, a ray of hope." Among multiple other positive reviews included The Los Angeles Times, lauding "an antidote to the oversimplifying red state/blue state rubric"; The Denver Post, which enthused "a euphoric collection"; and PopMatters, which commended the matching of writer to state. In 2021, amidst calls for a new Federal Writers' Project to rehabilitate the country and its writers in the wake of the COVID-19 pandemic, PopMatters revisited State by State in a deep dive, finding it a failure on its own terms. Purporting to remedy ignorance, writers continually exhibit it.

== Essays ==
The anthology challenged stereotypes about the country, with the Northeast emerging as one of the more backward regions. Connecticut is a state you drive through on the way to somewhere else, "somewhere better." Rhode Island, while a paradise for some, is also a place of terrifying bigotry and racial prejudice ("the heart of darkness," according Jhumpa Lahiri, who confirmed that Rhode Island "is not" an island). New Jersey, true to repute, is "a state that smells." New York is where you can glimpse the future, a wasteland of "shittily built neither-nor" (Franzen). New Hampshire is a bright spot, with residents who have vegetable gardens instead of blogs, as is Vermont, because the "typical Vermonter" is gay (Alison Bechdel reports). The Midwest and South appear idyllic. "Life is easier" in Georgia, Mississippi is home to "smart, gentle talented gals and pals," Wisconsinites have an unshakable kindness. Montana is surprisingly literary (Vowell: "all Montanans" have in common "a love of William Shakespeare.") California is place of enviable freedom, where residents can duck hunt and hike on their own terms (Vollmann). Iowa is notable for its Mexican population. Michigan is home to three types of Michiganders: the outdoorsman, the sports fanatic, and the poet.

- Alabama - George Packer
- Alaska - Paul Greenberg
- Arizona - Lydia Millet
- Arkansas - Kevin Brockmeier
- California - William T. Vollmann
- Colorado - Benjamin Kunkel
- Connecticut - Rick Moody
- Delaware - Craig Taylor
- Florida - Joshua Ferris
- Georgia - Ha Jin
- Hawaii - Tara Bray Smith
- Idaho - Anthony Doerr
- Illinois - Dave Eggers
- Indiana - Susan Choi
- Iowa - Dagoberto Gilb
- Kansas - Jim Lewis
- Kentucky - John Jeremiah Sullivan
- Louisiana - Joshua Clark
- Maine - Heidi Julavits
- Maryland - Myla Goldberg
- Massachusetts - John Hodgman
- Michigan - Mohammed Naseehu Ali
- Minnesota - Philip Connors
- Mississippi - Barry Hannah
- Missouri - Jacki Lyden
- Montana - Sarah Vowell
- Nebraska - Alexander Payne
- Nevada - Charles Bock
- New Hampshire - Will Blythe
- New Jersey - Anthony Bourdain
- New Mexico - Ellery Washington
- New York - Jonathan Franzen
- North Carolina - Randall Kenan
- North Dakota - Louise Erdrich
- Ohio - Susan Orlean
- Oklahoma - S. E. Hinton
- Oregon - Joe Sacco
- Pennsylvania - Andrea Lee
- Rhode Island - Jhumpa Lahiri
- South Carolina - Jack Hitt
- South Dakota - Said Sayrafiezadeh
- Tennessee - Ann Patchett
- Texas - Cristina Henríquez
- Utah - David Rakoff
- Vermont - Alison Bechdel
- Virginia - Tony Horwitz
- Washington - Carrie Brownstein
- West Virginia - Jayne Anne Phillips
- Wisconsin - Daphne Beal
- Wyoming - Alexandra Fuller

Afterword: Washington, D.C. - A Conversation with Edward P. Jones
