= 2017 Man Booker Prize =

Literary award

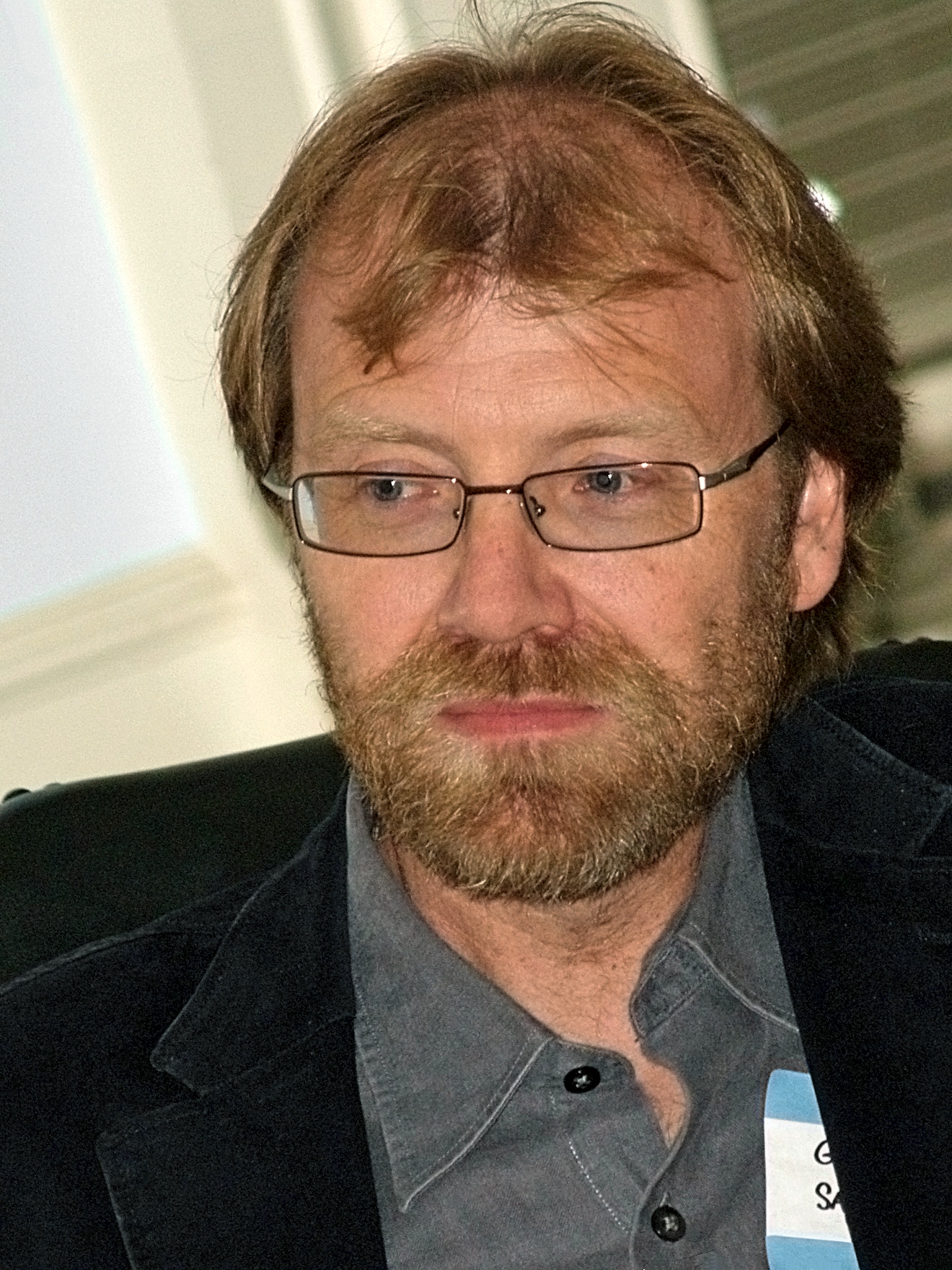
George Saunders, winner of the 2017 Man Booker Prize

The 2017 Booker Prize for Fiction was awarded at a ceremony on 17 October 2017. The Man Booker dozen of 13 books was announced on 27 July, narrowed down to a shortlist of six titles on 13 September. George Saunders was awarded the 2017 Booker Prize for his novel Lincoln in the Bardo, receiving £50,000 (~$65,000), and becoming the second American author in a row to be awarded the prize.

== Judging panel ==
- Lola, Baroness Young
- Lila Azam Zanganeh
- Sarah Hall
- Colin Thubron
- Tom Phillips

== Nominees ==
indicates the winner

=== Shortlist ===
Author	Title	Genre(s)	Country	Publisher
George Saunders	Lincoln in the Bardo	Historical/Experimental	US	Bloomsbury Publishing
Paul Auster	4 3 2 1	Novel	US	Faber & Faber
Emily Fridlund	History of Wolves	Novel	US	Weidenfeld & Nicolson
Mohsin Hamid	Exit West	Novel	UK-Pakistan	Hamish Hamilton
Fiona Mozley	Elmet	Novel	UK	JM Originals, John Murray
Ali Smith	Autumn	Novel	UK	Hamish Hamilton

=== Longlist ===
Author	Title	Genre(s)	Country	Publisher
George Saunders	Lincoln in the Bardo	Historical/Experimental	US	Bloomsbury Publishing
Paul Auster	4 3 2 1	Novel	US	Faber & Faber
Emily Fridlund	History of Wolves	Novel	US	Weidenfeld & Nicolson
Mohsin Hamid	Exit West	Novel	UK-Pakistan	Hamish Hamilton
Fiona Mozley	Elmet	Novel	UK	JM Originals, John Murray
Ali Smith	Autumn	Novel	UK	Hamish Hamilton
Sebastian Barry	Days Without End	Novel	Ireland	Faber & Faber
Mike McCormack	Solar Bones	Novel	Ireland	Canongate
Jon McGregor	Reservoir 13	Novel	US	Viking Press
Arundhati Roy	The Ministry of Utmost Happiness	Novel	India	Hamish Hamilton
Kamila Shamsie	Home Fire	Novel	UK-Pakistan	Bloomsbury Circus
Zadie Smith	Swing Time	Novel	UK	Hamish Hamilton
Colson Whitehead	The Underground Railroad	Novel	US	Fleet Publishing

== See also ==
- List of winners and shortlisted authors of the Booker Prize
