= Craig Taylor (writer) =

Canadian journalist

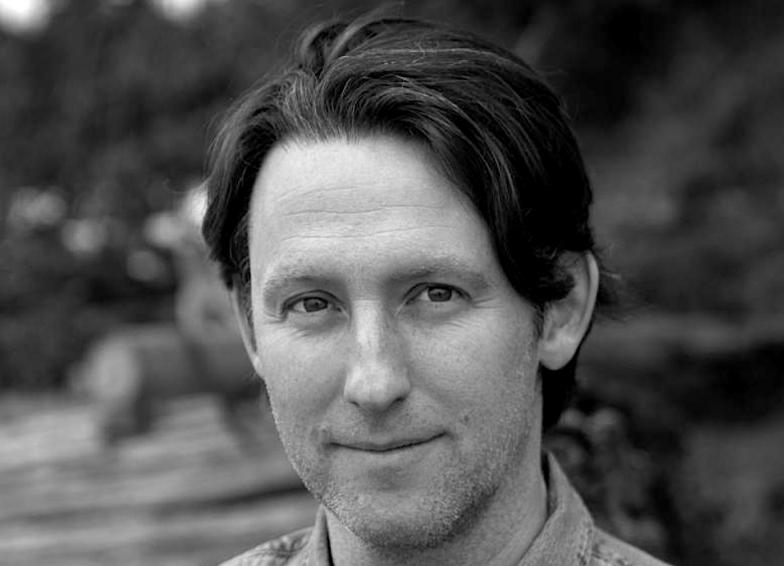
- Born: 1976 (age 49–50); Edmonton, Alberta, Canada
- Education: Vancouver Island University; Bishop's University; Royal Holloway, University of London
- Occupations: Writer, playwright
- Website: www.craigdtaylor.com

Craig Taylor (born 1976) is a Canadian writer and playwright. He is the author of several books, among them Return to Akenfield, a follow-up to Ronald Blythe's 1969 work; One Million Tiny Plays About Britain, a collection of short plays; the best-selling Londoners, and New Yorkers, which won the Brooklyn Public Library Prize for Non-Fiction. Taylor teaches creative writing at Vancouver Island University.

In the Times Literary Supplement, Mary Norris described Taylor as "as skilled a writer of literary nonfiction as I have ever read." The New York Times calls his work a "master class in self-effacing journalism." According to the Toronto Star, "His literary forebears are James Agee, author of Let Us Now Praise Famous Men, and Joseph Mitchell, who captured the heartbeat of New York in the magazine pieces that comprise Up In the Old Hotel."

From 2008 to 2023, Taylor served as editor of Five Dials, a literary magazine published by Hamish Hamilton, an imprint of Penguin Random House UK.

== Early life and education ==
Taylor was born in Edmonton and grew up in Lantzville, British Columbia. He studied at Vancouver Island University, Bishop's University, and Royal Holloway College, University of London. Taylor moved to London in 2000, and then to New York in 2014. In addition to his position at Vancouver Island University, he teaches a summer workshop at the SVA in Manhattan and was a visiting fellow at King's College, London.

== Career ==
=== Books ===
==== New Yorkers ====
Taylor's fourth book, a combination of reportage and oral history, aimed to give voice to the uncelebrated people who propel New York each day—bodega cashier, hospital nurse, elevator repairman, emergency dispatcher, and many more. The book won the 2021 Brooklyn Public Library Prize for Nonfiction. "In his landmark book," the library noted in its citation, "Craig Taylor depicts an indelible portrait of New York in the first 20 years of the 21st century."

The New Yorker was impressed by the scope of the project, noting that "The kaleidoscopic portrait captures the city's thrilling lexical diversity, as well as moments of grace, compassion, cruelty, and racism."

"The people are the texture of New York," wrote Erica Wagner in the New Statesman, "and there are 75 of them in New Yorkers, speaking in their own voices of their own experiences. Taylor is Canadian, an outsider: his love of New York is plain, his ability to listen extraordinary."

The Irish Examiner noted the book's symphonic structure: "The author blends scores of marvelous human stories, told in each individual's own words, into a kind of magnificent chorus of human striving, which sometimes swells to an absolute crescendo in New York."

==== Londoners ====
Published in 2011, Londoners: The Days and Nights of London Now – As Told by Those Who Love It, Hate It, Live It, Left It, and Long for It was the result of five years of research and more than 200 interviews with Londoners of all walks of life.

Critics were overwhelmingly positive in their reviews. The Londonist called it "The best book about London in at least a decade." According to Sarah Lyall in The New York Times, Londoners is "a rich and exuberant kaleidoscopic portrait of a great, messy, noisy, daunting, inspiring, maddening, enthralling, constantly shifting Rorschach test of a place… though countless excellent books have been written on the city, this is the one that best captures what it's like to live in London right now, through the words of the people themselves." "A reader does not have to be a Londoner to enjoy the book, but only someone who is fascinated by people," wrote Diana Athill in the Literary Review. "To those two famous masters of oral history, Studs Terkel and Ronald Blythe, we must now add the name of Craig Taylor." Iain Sinclair in The Guardian characterizes Londoners as "a monument pieced together from a mass of broken shards. A work made from work, from movement," while Alexander Larman in The Observer states that the book will be "as useful to future generations as the diaries of Pepys or Boswell."

Londoners was a best-seller and a BBC Book of the Week.

==== One Million Tiny Plays ====
One Million Tiny Plays About Britain, published by Bloomsbury in 2009, is a collection of 95 short dramatic works, some of which appeared in Taylor’s long-running column for the Guardian Weekend magazine.

"Craig Taylor's playlets, which began as a column in The Guardian newspaper, are so exquisitely observed that they often read like snatches of real-life conversation," writes David Evans in The Independent. "There is pathos here too: Taylor participates in that peculiarly British tradition in which comedy is laced with sadness. There are shades of Alan Bennett, and even The Office."

A selection of the plays was published in 2002 by McSweeney's.

==== Return to Akenfield ====
Taylor's 2006 debut was a follow-up to Ronald Blythe's 1969 classic, Akenfield.

In 2004, he lived for months in the village in Suffolk on which Akenfield was based. Over the course of several months, Taylor sought out locals who had appeared in the original book to see how their lives had changed, he met newcomers to discuss their own views, and he interviewed Ronald Blythe himself.

Young farmers, retired orchardmen and Eastern European migrant workers spoke about the nature of farming in an age of digitalization and encroaching supermarkets; commuters, weekenders and retirees discussed the realities behind the rural idyll; and the local priest, teacher and more described the daily pleasures and tribulations of village life. Together, they offered a panoramic and revealing portrait of rural English society at a time of great change.

"A generous tribute to the generosity of the place it describes," Andrew Motion wrote in The Guardian. "Taylor avoids cliches about the countryside being in a state of change (it always is), and concentrates instead on nailing the detail. The result is clear-eyed, astringent and none the less moving for it."

The Daily Telegraph called it, "A little masterpiece of humour, reminiscence and analysis…"

=== Plays ===
==== Return to Akenfield ====
Return to Akenfield, based on Taylor's book, premiered at Eastern Angles in 2009. It toured theatres, village halls and barns across Suffolk.

"The adaptation is faultless," wrote Hugh Homan in The Stage.

In a four-star review in The Guardian, Lyn Gardner wrote the play was "keeping the voices of villagers alive in this excellent, small-scale, verbatim-style piece that is largely playing in village halls and barns."

==== One Million Tiny Plays About Britain ====
Numerous adaptations of Taylor's One Million Tiny Plays About Britain project have been staged in the UK and abroad, including a professional production at Glasgow's Citz Theatre in 2010 which transferred to the Edinburgh Festival in 2011. A second production of One Million Tiny Plays About Britain premiered at The Watermill in 2016 and, following an acclaimed run at Jermyn Street Theatre, in the heart of London's West End in 2020, returned to the Watermill.

His work, Freedom Play, was premiered at the Royal Festival Hall as part of the London Literature Festival in 2014.

== Magazines ==
In 2008, Taylor and Hamish Hamilton publishing director Simon Prosser created a literary magazine called Five Dials. Over its sixteen-year existence, the magazine published 66 issues, featuring short fiction, essays, letters, poetry, interviews and reporting from around the world alongside contemporary illustrations, including work by W.G. Sebald, Zadie Smith, Ali Smith, Bernardine Evaristo, Geoff Dyer, and Javier Marias.

Five Dials was published as a PDF. According to Interview magazine, Five Dials "isn't so much a hard object as it is a delivery method for all manner of great writing."

According to the Bookseller, the magazine "explored the possibilities of digital publishing and found a perfect form: the humble PDF," offering "a wry, honest, democratic, self-deprecating and open-hearted voice."

In 2000, Taylor designed and illustrated Open Letters, edited by Paul Tough. One of his essays was featured alongside Zadie Smith and Robert Christgau in White Noise, a collection edited by Hilton Als and Darryl A. Turner.

== Methodology ==
Taylor has professed admiration for Rachel Cusk's techniques in the Outline series, "in which the reader senses a presence, a character who is listening to all these stories."

In an interview with The Tyee, Taylor emphasized the collaborative nature of his books. "You have to be with people and spend time with them. There's no shortcut. I've been lucky to work on long projects that allow for lots of time to be spent, because I can't do it any other way. These books can't be forced."

Jeffrey Burke, reviewing Taylor's contribution to the compendium State by State, noted that "Taylor conveys Delaware through a string of voices, from Butcher to Bookseller to ex-Governor, like Virtues or Perils in an Everyman play."

== Other work ==
In 2018, Taylor collaborated with tech company WeTransfer, gun violence advocate Lee Keylock, survivor Carolyn Tuft and inkmaker Jason Logan to produce an interactive reading experience focusing on American mass shootings entitled Anything But Guns.

He wrote the Delaware chapter of the compendium State by State, edited by Matt Weiland and Sean Wilsey, and featuring Jonathan Franzen, Dave Eggers, and Jhumpa Lahiri. "Some of the essays — including...Craig Taylor's beautifully reported take on Delaware — are among the finest you'll read all year," wrote Louis Bayard in Salon.

Taylor's first zine, Anonymous Juice, was "an epic debut" in the Canadian independent scene and featured "Poutine Ruined My Life." Taylor's account of publishing Anonymous Juice and his dealings in the world of literary blogging was outlined in the Guardian Weekend magazine.

== Bibliography ==
- Return to Akenfield: Portrait of an English Village (2006)
- State by State (Delaware) (2008)
- One Million Tiny Plays About Britain (2009)
- Londoners: The Days and Nights of London Now – As Told by Those Who Love It, Hate It, Live It, Left It, and Long for It (2011)
- New Yorkers: A City and Its People in Our Time (2021)
