= Londoners (book) =

2011 book by Craig Taylor

Londoners : the days and nights of London now-- as told by those who love it, hate it, live it, left it and long for it
- First edition (to reflect colours of tube map)
- Author: Craig Taylor
- Subject: Oral history of London
- Set in: London
- Published: London
- Publisher: Granta Books
- Publication date: 2011
- Publication place: United Kingdom
- Pages: 436
- ISBN: 9781847083296
- Dewey Decimal: 942.1086

Londoners : the days and nights of London now—as told by those who love it, hate it, live it, left it and long for it is a 2011 book by Canadian-born British author, Craig Taylor.

== Synopsis ==
The book contains 80 different stories written by Londoners and other associated with the city about their perspective on the city. Those who contributed to the book included the woman who voices station announcements on the London Underground, a man who plants trees along Oxford Street, a British Pakistani currency trader and a guardsman at Buckingham Palace

== Content ==
The book is divided into three different parts each one structured around the experiences of Londoners interviewed. The content of the book is then organised as follow:

Part I

- Arriving
- Getting Around
- Seeing the sights
- Earning one's keep
- Loving one another
- Getting on with it

Part II

- Continuing your journey
- Gleaning on the margins
- Feeding the city
- Climbing the ladder
- Putting on a show
- Going out

Part III

- Making a life
- Getting along
- Keeping the peace
- Staying on top
- Living and dying
- Departing

== Reception ==
The book was widely praised. Londonist declared it 'the best book about London in at least a decade'. In The Observer Alexander Larman wrote that the book was 'immensely enjoyable' and 'Taylor's superb book does full justice to London and its people, and should be enjoyed by everyone, whether they love the place or regret ever having set foot there'. Oona King remarked that'the eloquence of the voices in this book is remarkable' while in the Wales Arts Review Adam Somerset wrote 'reading Taylor's exhilarating series of snapshots made me want to run for the first train to Euston. The book was also praised in The New York Times and featured on the BBC
