= Night Watch (Phillips novel) =

2023 novel by Jayne Anne Phillips

- First edition cover
- Author: Jayne Anne Phillips
- Cover artist: Kelly Blair (designer)
- Language: English
- Genre: Fiction
- Publisher: Alfred A. Knopf
- Publication date: September 19, 2023
- Pages: 276
- Awards: Pulitzer Prize for Fiction

Night Watch is a 2023 novel by Jayne Anne Phillips which, alongside being longlisted for the National Book Award, won the 2024 Pulitzer Prize for Fiction. The novel is historical fiction, set during the American Civil War.

== Plot summary ==
In 1874, after the Civil War, civilians and veterans, freedmen, and runaways are haunted by erasure, trauma, and namelessness. Twelve-year-old ConaLee has been the adult in her family for as long as she can remember. She and her mother, Eliza, who has not spoken in over a year, are on a journey in a buckboard. They are brought to the Trans-Allegheny Lunatic Asylum in West Virginia by a war veteran who has forced himself into their lives. Far from their family, a beloved neighbor, and the mountain home they once knew, they try to rebuild their lives.

As the story unfolds, the impact of war and race becomes clear. ConaLee's father disappeared after leaving for the war and never returned. At the asylum, ConaLee pretends to be her mother's maid, while Eliza slowly begins to respond to treatment. They become part of the facility's life, meeting the mysterious Night Watch, an orphan named Weed, the strict woman who runs the kitchen, and the remarkable doctor in charge of the institution.

== Reception ==
Writing for The Guardian, Laird Hunt stated that Phillips' writing "feels true to the profoundly destabilising nature of her subject," calling it "excruciating" but "excellent." The Washington Post review by Wendy Smith said that the novel put readers "in thrall to a master storyteller who enmeshes us in the life of the asylum while tantalizing us with the promise of further revelations about the life that ConaLee and her mother left behind." The New York Times review by Dwight Gardner called the book "sludgy, claustrophobic and pretentious."

== Accolades ==
=== Awards ===
- Winner, 2024 Pulitzer Prize for Fiction
- Longlisted, 2023 National Book Award for Fiction

=== Honors ===
- Best Books of 2023, The New Yorker
