= Lila Azam Zanganeh =

French writer (born 1976)

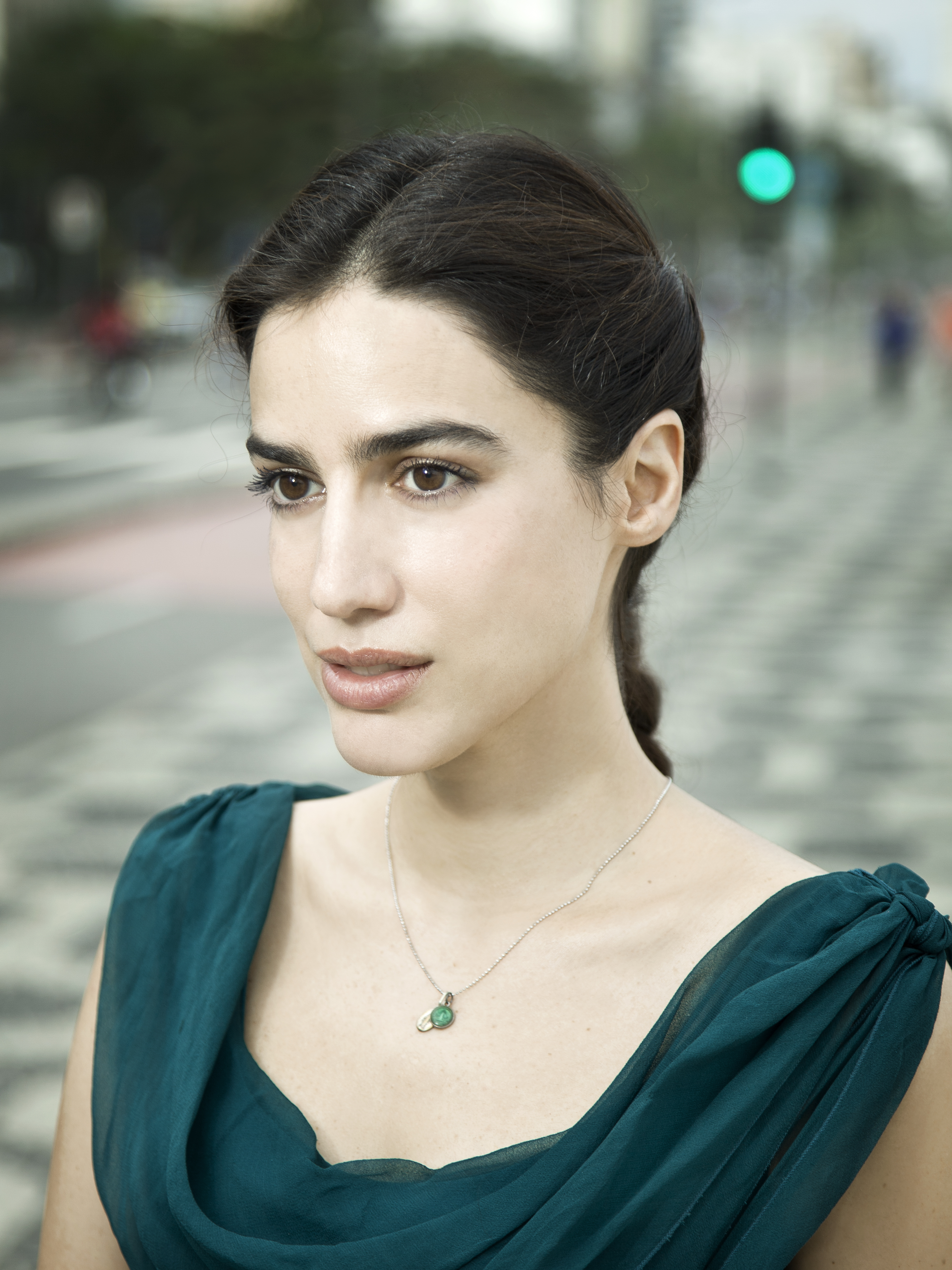
- Azam Zanganeh in 2013
- Born: 1976; Paris, France
- Education: École Normale Supérieure, Harvard University
- Occupation: Writer
- Writing career
- Period: 2002–present
- Website: lazanganeh.com

Lila Azam Zanganeh is a writer born and raised in Paris, France, by exiled Iranian parents. She lives and works in New York City. She is the author of The Enchanter: Nabokov and Happiness (Penguin Books, 2011). She was a member of the jury for the 2017 Man Booker Prize for fiction. In 2021, she published a long-form essay in Lolita in the Afterlife (Vintage Books, 2021). Her forthcoming novel, Exit Paradise, will be published in 2026.

== Life and work ==
Azam Zanganeh was born in Paris to Iranian parents. After studying literature and philosophy at the École Normale Supérieure, she moved to the United States to become a teaching fellow in literature, cinema, and Romance languages at Harvard University. In 2002, she began contributing literary articles, interviews, and essays to a host of American and European publications, among which The New York Times, The Paris Review, Le Monde, and la Repubblica.

She also holds a master's degree in international affairs from Columbia University.

Her first book, The Enchanter: Nabokov and Happiness, has been published by W. W. Norton & Company in the United States, Penguin Books in the United Kingdom, Éditions de l'Olivier in France, Contact in Holland, L'Ancora del Mediterraneo in Italy, Duomo Ediciones in Spain, Azbooka in Russia, Büchergilde Gutenberg in Germany, Everest in Turkey, Shang Shu in China, Al-Kamel in Lebanon, Mehri Publications in Iran, and Alfaguara Objetiva in Brazil, where it reached No. 10 on the national Brazilian bestseller list.

She is fluent in seven languages (English, French, Persian, Spanish, Italian, Russian, and Portuguese). She writes and lives in New York City. Her new novel, Exit Paradise, is forthcoming in 2026.

== Social initiatives ==
- Azam Zanganeh served on the Board of Overseers of the International Rescue Committee for 12 years.
- Azam Zanganeh was a member of the advisory board of The Lunchbox Fund, a non-profit organization that delivers a daily meal to pupils in township schools in Soweto, South Africa, until the end of 2011.
- She is a global ambassador for Libraries Without Borders as well as a board member of Narrative4, an international story-exchange organization that promotes radical empathy.

== Works and Publications ==
- Zanganeh, Lila Azam (2011). The Enchanter: Nabokov and Happiness. p. 256. ISBN 978-0-393-07992-0. (Portuguese Brazilian Edition)
- My Sister, Guard Your Veil, My Brother, Guard Your Eyes: Uncensored Iranian Voices (2006) (edited by Lila Azam Zanganeh). ISBN 978-0-8070-0463-0
- Modern Classics Paris by Julien Green, Lila Azam Zanganeh (co-author) ISBN 978-0141194653
- Where You Are: A Collection of Maps That Will Leave You Feeling Completely Lost Lila Azam Zanganeh (contributing author) ISBN 978-0956569240
- L'estate la sentivo arrivare dal viale, Lila Azam Zanganeh (interviewer)

== Awards and recognition ==
- The Enchanter is the recipient of the Roger Shattuck Prize for Criticism, awarded each year by the Center for Fiction, 2011.
- Recognized by The Man Booker Prize which named her as a judge for the 2017 PEN/NABOKOV AWARD FOR ACHIEVEMENT IN INTERNATIONAL LITERATURE section. She served on a panel of five judges, chaired by Baroness Lola Young.
