= Brad Watson (writer) =

American writer (1955-2020)

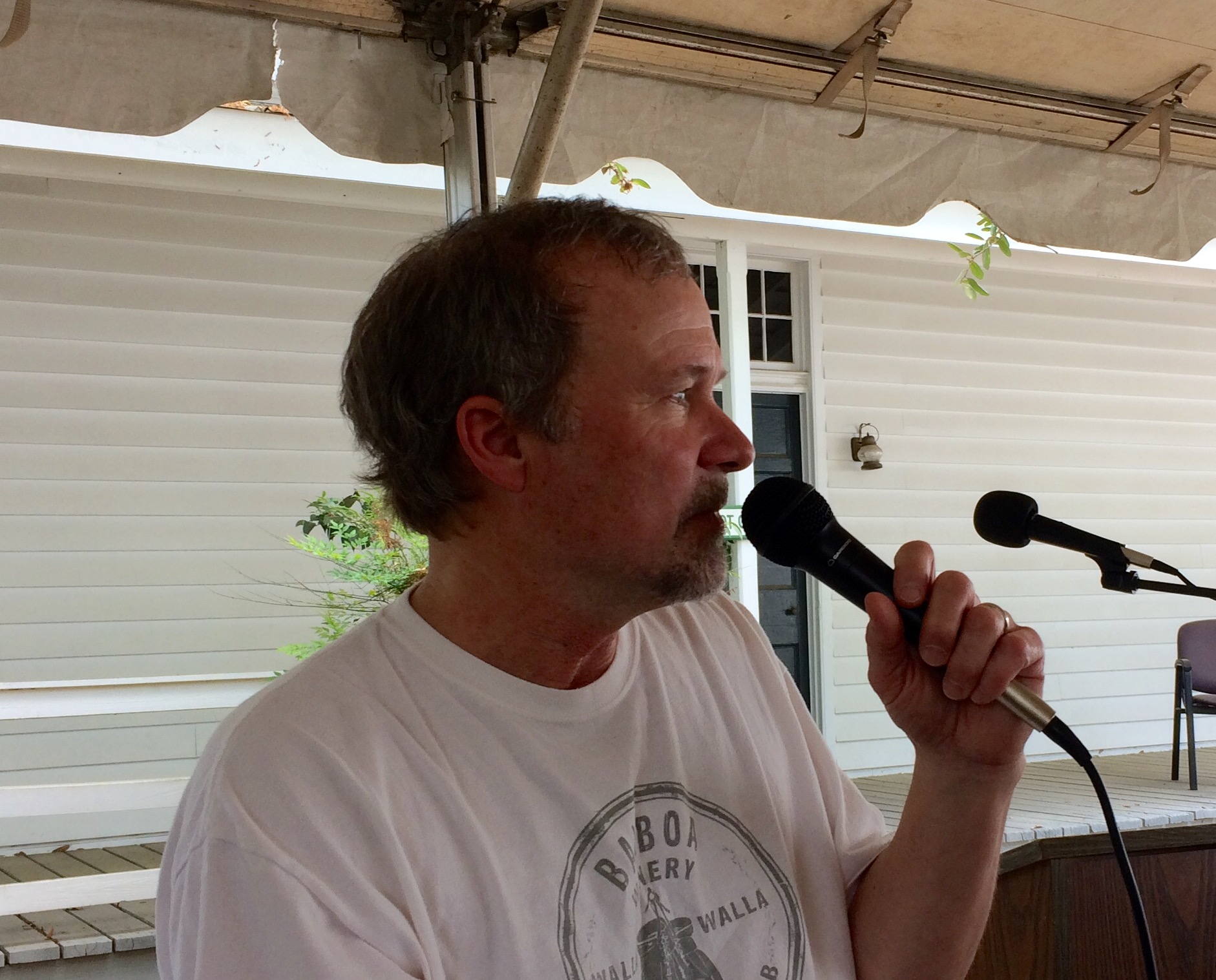
- Watson in 2017
- Born: Wilton Brad Watson; July 24, 1955; Meridian, Mississippi, U.S.
- Died: July 8, 2020 (aged 64); Laramie, Wyoming, U.S.
- Education: Meridian Junior College; Mississippi State University; University of Alabama
- Occupations: Author, professor
- Writing career
- Notable works: Miss Jane, The Heaven of Mercury

Wilton Brad Watson (July 24, 1955 – July 8, 2020) was an American author and teacher of creative writing. Originally from Mississippi, he worked and lived in Alabama, Florida, California, Boston, and Wyoming. He was a professor at the University of Wyoming from 2005 until his death in 2020. In his lifetime Watson published four books – two novels and two collections of short stories – to critical acclaim; a collection of stories was published posthumously.

== Early life ==
Watson was born in Meridian, Mississippi on July 24, 1955. He was the second of three sons of Robert Earl Watson and Bonnie Clay. He married his high school sweetheart while still in school, and they had a son together. They moved to Los Angeles after finishing high school, and Brad worked as a garbage truck driver while aspiring to become an actor. He went home to Mississippi after his older brother, Clay, died in a car accident. He went back to school, first at Meridian Junior College and then Mississippi State University, where he graduated with a degree in English. Subsequently, he undertook postgraduate studies at the University of Alabama, obtaining a Master of Fine Arts in writing and American literature.

== Career ==
After working as a newspaper reporter and editor and at an advertising agency, he returned to the University of Alabama to teach creative writing; he also worked for the university's public relations department. While at Alabama he published Last Days of the Dog-Men (1996), which had taken him ten years to write and won him the Sue Kaufman Prize for First Fiction and The Great Lakes New Writers Award. Amy Grace Lloyd, writing for The New York Times twenty years later, called it "a near-perfect story collection". In 1997 he moved to Cambridge, Massachusetts, where he was the Briggs-Copeland Lecturer at Harvard University until 2002. He was a writer in residence at the University of West Florida, the University of Alabama, the University of Mississippi, and the University of California, Irvine. Beginning in 2005, he taught at the University of Wyoming, where he was a professor of creative writing and literature in the Department of Visual & Literary Arts.

Watson's 2002 novel The Heaven of Mercury was a finalist for the National Book Award. His 2010 collection of short stories Aliens in the Prime of Their Lives received positive reviews in The New York Times and the Boston Phoenix; its stories contained "divorces, miscarriages, an argument that ends in bungled gunplay, a joint-custody visitation, even a touch of incest", and Watson himself considered some of them some of the funniest stuff he'd ever written. His work has appeared in The New Yorker. The book was a finalist for The PEN/Faulkner Award in 2011. Two years later, Watson received the Award in Letters from The American Academy of Arts and Letters.

His 2016 novel Miss Jane is set in Depression-era Mississippi; its main character, Jane Chisolm, is inspired by one of his great-aunts, a woman with an unknown (to family survivors) urogenital condition that rendered her incontinent and possibly made her incapable of having vaginal sex. Watson has stated in interviews that he could not write the book until he found a medical condition that would seem to fit what little family survivors knew and remembered about his great-aunt's condition. The novel was praised by critics, with Silas House saying it "takes Watson's writing to new heights". The novel was one of ten books long-listed for The National Book Award in Fiction in 2016. It was an ebook bestseller on Amazon.com in 2020.

=== Subject matter and style ===
Watson is frequently called a Southern writer, and acknowledged his heritage and his love for family and friends, particularly after moving to Wyoming in 2005. At community college in Meridian, he became inspired by William Faulkner, Robert Penn Warren, and Flannery O'Connor. He is praised for his portrayal of Southern issues and problems (racism and segregation being one of the subject matters of Heaven of Mercury), but commented also on stereotypical simplifications of the South in other parts of America:

For all the ways [the South] is struggling and, yes, deficient, or failing, flailing, it is also a place full of wonderful people, and possibly one of the most diverse places in the country. Not that everyone gets along. There is ignorance, there is racism. There are also more proud people trying to change that than might be apparent from the results at the polling booths. But writing the book, I was just thinking about these people, trying to make them real people in the reader’s mind. Here’s an anecdote, though. I was at a tea party or the like at a famous university in the early stages of researching Miss Jane, and I asked the host--who was a pediatrician, for goodness sake--if he could speculate on what might have been my great aunt’s condition. His response was, "You're from Mississippi, right? Is there any history of incest in your family?"

== Death ==
Watson died on July 8, 2020, at his home in Laramie, Wyoming. He was 64.

== Books ==
- Last Days of the Dog-Men: Stories. W. W. Norton. 1996. ISBN 978-0-393-32120-3.
- The Heaven of Mercury: A Novel. W. W. Norton. 2002. ISBN 978-0-393-32465-5.
- Aliens in the Prime of Their Lives: Stories. W. W. Norton. 2010. ISBN 978-0-393-33885-0.
- Miss Jane: A Novel. W. W. Norton. 2016. ISBN 978-0-393-24173-0.
- There Is Happiness: New and Selected Stories. W. W. Norton. 2024. ISBN 978-1-324-07642-1.

=== Anthologies ===
- Furman, Laura, ed. (2011). "Alamo Plaza". PEN/O. Henry Prize Stories 2011: The Best Stories of the Year. Random House Digital, Inc. ISBN 978-0-307-80594-2.

== Awards ==
- Sue Kaufman Prize for First Fiction, American Academy of Arts and Letters (Last Days of the Dog-Men)
- Great Lakes Colleges Association New Writers Award
- Finalist for the National Book Award (The Heaven of Mercury)
- Mississippi Institute of Arts and Letters Award in Fiction (2003 and 2011)
- Southern Book Critics Circle Award in Fiction
- 2004 National Endowment of the Arts Grant in Fiction
- Finalist, 2010 PEN/Faulkner Award for Fiction (Aliens in the Prime of Their Lives)
- Finalist, 2011 St. Francis College Literary Award ("Aliens in the Prime of Their Lives")
- 2011 Guggenheim Fellowship
- 2013 Award in Letters, American Academy of Arts and Letters
- 2016 Longlist, National Book Award in Fiction, "Miss Jane"
- 2017 Harper Lee Award
