= Heaven Lake (novel) =

2004 novel by John Dalton

- First edition
- Author: John Dalton
- Language: English
- Publisher: Scribner's
- Publication date: Mar 2004
- Publication place: United States
- Media type: Print
- Pages: 464
- ISBN: 0-7432-4634-9

Heaven Lake is the debut novel of American author John Dalton published in 2004. It won both the 2005 Sue Kaufman Prize from the American Academy of Arts and Letters and the 2004 Barnes & Noble Discover Great New Writers Award in Fiction. It gets its name from the Heaven Lake of Tian Shan in northwest China which features towards the end of the novel.

== Background and inspiration ==
John Dalton himself spent time in Douliu City, Taiwan teaching English and was eating in a restaurant with other teachers when a local businessman approached and told of his love for a woman in mainland China and offered $10,000 to anyone who would marry her and bring her back. Dalton used this experience as the basis for his novel. It took eight years to write and he was inspired by a number of writers, among them Charles Baxter, Alice Munro and specifically Disgrace by J. M. Coetzee and Amy and Isabelle by Elizabeth Strout.

== Plot introduction ==
The story begins in Douliu, Taiwan where Christian volunteer and recent college graduate Vincent Saunders from Red Bud, Illinois, fluent in Mandarin, arrives to teach English and to share his faith. Soon after opening a ministry school, he meets wealthy businessman Mr. Gwa, who explains that he has fallen in love with a girl in mainland China but is unable to marry her due to the political situation between Taiwan and China. He offers Vincent $10,000 to travel to Urumchi in the far northwest of China near the eponymous Heaven Lake and marry the girl, bringing her back to Taiwan where she would be free to marry Mr. Gwa. Vincent refuses but later develops a relationship with one of his young students, which causes him to abandon his faith and to reconsider the offer.

== Reception ==
Reviews were 'mostly positive':

- Publishers Weekly said "Sober and searching yet sublimely comic, this impressive debut about a modern-day missionary in Taiwan charts a journey away from reflexive faith and toward a broader understanding of the world and its ways. Reminiscent of the work of Graham Greene and Norman Rush, but possessing a quirky innocence and gravitas all its own, the novel is crammed with heady matters, clashes of cultures, ill-considered schemes and unrequited love...Dalton revises conventional assumptions about contemporary China and collective cultural views of love and marriage. This is a noteworthy first novel by a writer to watch."
- Seth Faison in the Los Angeles Times writes "Ultimately, Heaven Lake offers a touching meditation on the vagaries of love. Dalton has an intoxicating ability to infuse simple scenes with considerable depth of human emotion. His characters are richly drawn. His throwaway references are delicate and revealing. In the end, Heaven Lake is a winning novel for the way that Dalton lets his characters fumble and survive moments of choice in a wobbly manner that is recognizably human."
- Kirkus Reviews was however negative saying "A plodding first novel, hollow at its center".
