= Notes from a Coma =

2005 novel by Mike McCormack

Notes from a Coma is a postmodern science fiction novel by Mike McCormack. It was published in 2005.

It features the “Somnos Project”, an experiment to eradicate prison by placing convicts into comas instead. The central character is JJ, a Romanian orphan adopted by County Mayo bachelor Anthony O'Malley. McCormack says he felt drawn towards the science fiction genre of approach towards writing. It took him seven years to write the book.

In 2006, Notes from a Coma was shortlisted for the Irish Book of the Year Award. In 2010, John Waters in The Irish Times described it as "the greatest Irish novel of the decade just ended".

It was in 2013 published in the United States. There, it was hailed as "a noteworthy introduction of a significant Irish writer to a U.S. audience."
