= Black Tickets =

1979 short story collection by Jayne Anne Phillips

- First edition cover of Black Tickets
- Author: Jayne Anne Phillips
- Publisher: Delacorte Books
- Publication date: September 28, 1979
- Award: Sue Kaufman Prize for First Fiction (1980)

Black Tickets (1979) is a collection of short stories by American writer Jayne Anne Phillips. The collection was published by Delacorte Books/Seymour Lawrence. In 1980, it won the inaugural Sue Kaufman Prize for First Fiction.

Writing in 2017 in the New York Times about the book, critic Dwight Garner wrote: "Black Tickets was published when Phillips was 26. It was her third collection but it felt like a debut and a reckoning. Here was a voice coming fully into its own, and more than one reader I know toted the book around like a secret. The book was also a flare, one that would help light the landscape of the so-called dirty realists (Raymond Carver, Bobbie Ann Mason, Richard Ford, Phillips and others)..."

== Content ==
=== "Wedding Picture" ===
The story begins with the narrator looking at his/her mother's wedding picture. The narrator notices details about his/her mother and also the man in the picture who is his/her father. The narrator then alludes to the early death of the high school boyfriend of the bride in the wedding picture. The wedding picture was taken in 1948, and the prose references the groom’s WWII experience, as well at the bride’s mother’s terminal illness. Phillips writes in a dark tone that leads the reader to believe that the lives of the mother and the narrator were not easy and did not go as planned. The narrator does not seem to resent the mother, so it seems that the mother has done the best she can with the circumstances of her life.

=== "Lechery" ===
A fourteen-year-old prostitute reflects upon her past. She recalls Uncle Wumpy, a man who bought her from Minnie, her then-foster parent who made her work at a luncheonette. The narrator has threesomes with Wumpy and Kitty, Wumpy's drug-addict partner, though Wumpy refuses to have sex with the narrator. The narrator reveals that Wumpy is the one who introduced her to prostitution. Sometimes the narrator fantasizes about Natalie, an eight-year-old girl she met while in foster care. She recalls when she and Natalie were playing in a shed when their foster father came in and forced Natalie to perform sexual acts on him. Sometimes the narrator fantasizes about Wumpy.

=== "Black Tickets" ===
Black Tickets begins with the narrator expressing his desire for Jamaica Delila. He discusses in depth how he watches her and notices that she likes to draw on herself, giving herself “tattoos.” The narrator then begins to expand on his working with Raymond in the coffee shop across from where Jamaica works. Following another fantasy of Jamaica, the narrator begins to tell of being in jail and how his father was not existent in his and his mother's lives. The narrator then changes abruptly to a recollection of the time he shared with Jamaica. In remembering his time with her, he also speaks of abuse and death. While telling of the times that his brother, Raymond, got Jamaica's attention, the narrator becomes quite jealous because he always paid attention to her but she preferred that Raymond did not look at her even. Following another flashback to a time where Jamaica told him about how she had wanted to cut her hair and be the boy of the family, the narrator resumes his thought in present-day and how he will be soon headed to a larger jail. He then recalls the last day that he saw Jamaica, when he woke up and her hair was all cut off.

=== "The Powder of the Angels, and I'm Yours" ===
This story begins as a flashback of an experience a girl has with drugs. She is always high on cocaine and it is suggested that she has a mental illness. She lives in a Spanish speaking country with a man named Hernando whom she met while in rehabilitation in California. Hernando, also a drug addict, and the girl get high together and she sends pictures of it to her friends back in the US. While smuggling drugs across the border they stop on a farmer's land after Hernando overdoses. They make a ruckus and the farmer runs out of his/her house and comes after them. The girl tries to escape with Hernando, but the narrator does not elaborate on what ends up happening to the both of them. Then, there is a time jump to the girl's recovery back in the US where she is in a sanitarium where the priests are blessing all of the people in rehabilitation.

=== "1934" ===
This story depicts a depression era family's struggles with their father, J.T., succumbing to senility. The narrator, J.T.’s daughter Francie, highlights the background of her father’s financial downfall and how his failing business causes him to spiral into a hysterical pitfall. He does things such as wandering the streets and calling his daughter ‘Frank’. Throughout the story, Francie becomes convinced by her grandmother that she is crazy like her father. Later, J.T. takes Francie out for a car ride and ends up crashing over a cliff. Everyone is still alive after the accident, but Franice continues to believe that she is crazy when she envisions people in houses off in the distance. However, her mother Lacey attempts to alleviate her concerns by showing her there are no people in the house and walking her through the empty homes. The story concludes with J.T. being sent away from the family.

=== "Solo Dance" ===
This story shows a broken relationship within a family. A daughter visits her father while he is in the hospital dying from cancer. The father is divorced from her mother, and it is obvious that this still affects him. The daughter remains by his side and helps with simple duties such as reading him his cards or helping him shave, but they do not share one word. This eloquent silence amplifies the deep connection between them, despite the familiar fractures caused by the divorce. The daughter notices the pattern in her father’s robe of “tiny sorrels (horses) in arabesque’s and remembers childhood ballet classes in which her instructor raised her leg so that her foot was beside her head, yet the narrator said nothing and met the instructor’s gaze in a refusal to admit to her pain. Her stoic response as a child mirrors her father’s understatement of pain — she is truly “her father’s daughter.”

=== "Happy" ===
This story describes, in the brevity of a paragraph, a woman's feelings for a male lover with whom she is no longer involved. She praises him in metaphoric language that references the meaning of the words. The narrator refers to “small soft hands, a bread of desire rising in her stomach”. The first sentence, “She knew if she loved him she could make him happy, but she didn’t” refers to the narrator’s knowledge that she can’t love this person in the way he or she wants to be loved. The tone is mournful, yet Phillips’ language celebrates love and desire.

=== "The Patron" ===
A man named James narrates the story, and is a caretaker for an old sick man. He takes care of the man eight hours a day and during that time, the old man is completely dependent on him for all basic needs. The old man is extremely wealthy and used to work as a dance teacher. He was so passionate about dance that he regularly has his former students come and perform for him. Throughout the story the narrator speculates on the old man’s homosexuality while not confirming his own sexuality. When James is not working for the old man he spends a lot time at a nearby bar watching clips from old films. Although he spends much time taking care of the old man, his motives are questionable as he entertains thoughts of stealing from the old man. James risks the health of the old man by manipulating his medications and pocketing a portion of the allotted amounts. In the end the narrator realizes that although the old man has his fortune, he is willing to sacrifice it to feel less alone.

=== "Strangers in the Night" ===
The narrator begins the story by telling readers that she often thinks about eating and sleeping, as though these two functions are sensually connected for her. She then discusses love making, referencing “strangers in the night” and the words to the well-known romantic song. The narrator finds spiritual transformation in sex, in which she feels “like death floating free.” Phillips’ sensory language implies that even strangers can experience profound connection in sexuality, and defy death. She “chews pears as though they are conscious.” All of life is connected: we only appear to be strangers. The author leaves much of the meaning of the story open to interpretation.

This is a second interpretation of the story. The short story begins with a statement that attempts to connect to the reader, and basically all of humanity. Everyone eats and sleeps, therefore the narrator is attempting to come across as normal. However, she feels an unusual connection between sleeping, eating, and sex. In sleep, she feels free and weightless and able to escape reality. In eating, she feels sensual and intimate. In sex, she also feels limitless and liberated, but also as if she is attached or being held down, suggesting that her morals are pulling her down as she has sex with potential strangers. When the narrator tries to explain these things to him (who could be basically anyone, considering the title), he attempts to comfort her but doesn't seem to truly listen to her feelings. She still feels as though she is in a shadow, or not truly present.

=== "Souvenir" ===
This short story portrays the life of a mother and daughter—the daughter, Kate, a young graduate student struggling to pay rent and find love, and a middle-aged widowed mother in an empty house. The mother develops a brain tumor the doctors believe to be malignant. However, Kate's brother Robert doesn't wish to tell their mother. Kate imagines her mother’s experience and the possibility that her mother will not survive. The two struggle together against the brutality and loneliness of life as they care for one another symbiotically. Kate realizes her duty and privilege in caring for her mother as she falls ill, for Kate's mother cared for her in her times of need. The story concludes when the two ride a Ferris wheel together, and Kate's mother assures her that the storm is “going to pass over,” symbolizing an attempt at optimism and strength through the circumstances they must face together.

=== "What it Takes to Keep a Young Girl Alive" ===
The short story is about a young girl, Sue, who takes a summer job at an amusement park with many other young kids. All the kids working at the park go through a lot of struggles to keep on working. Things get so difficult that at one point a coworker commits suicide. The boys working in the kitchen tally up which girl cries the most throughout the summer. This short story has a tone of irony and astutely references the rock and roll songs of the era. It’s a feminist story told about a time in which feminism was not recognized.

=== "Cheers" ===
A ten-year-old girl visits a sewing woman to have a cheerleading outfit made. As the woman works, the girl observes her unflattering make up and pitiful living conditions. A postcard hung on a wall depicting Florida and a television playing "Queen for a Day" in the background serve to further amplify the feelings of longing and misfortune present in the story, and stand in contrast with the young girl's experience, but her perceptions of the world address the narrow choices offered to women, and the romantic notions that delude women. The TV show “Queen For A Day” gave prizes like appliances or cars to the woman who competed by living the worst, most unsupported lives— making the title of “Queen” completely ironic.

=== "Snow" ===
The story begins in late summer of 1948 in Spenser, South Carolina. Phillips introduces a young girl named Molly watching her blind mother, Laura, dance at a carnival. Laura and her husband Randal met at a school for deaf, dumb, and blind, where he taught her how to read Braille and make love when she was sixteen. Randal lost his sight when he was seven from the measles and diphtheria and often tries to remember the shape of hands and fingers. Laura lost her sight at a young age from a car crash. She remembers the sight of rain and what her face looked like at that age, but mostly sees only blackness now. At eighteen, she became pregnant with Molly and married Randal, who was thirty-eight at the time. Later, they have a son, Callie, who from the beginning of the story, has deteriorating sight. He is given glasses and wears them all the time, but his vision continues to fade. As it does, it seems his nose bleeds frequently and becomes severe enough that he must be taken to the hospital.

Throughout the story, snow is used as a symbol to innocently hide what lies beneath it. Laura remembers a time when she made a snow angel, but it was quickly hidden by more snow. Randal tells Molly a story about a garden and when she asks where it is, he tells her it is hidden under the snow.

=== "Accidents" ===
A woman tells her readers about her life from two perspectives. She has been in an accident that may have caused head trauma, a story that she sometimes tells flirtatiously, or to get attention. She also is referring to her sexual encounters as "accidents." The difference between her physical injury, or the idea of "accidents" as representations of her sexual encounters is not clear; however, the narrator's confused tone on the subject and inability to remember certain events contribute to her lack of clarity and references her instability. What is the responsibility of those who hear her story? She concludes saying, "I hurt my head again, I hit it on the bed," which hints toward sexual meaning

=== "Gemcrack" ===
The narrator of this cryptic tale is a mass murderer mainly interested in targeting females. The story begins with a description of the act of murder from the narrators point of view, and then goes one to recount the murderer's past and consequential source of his obsession—from his childhood spent in an economically depressed mid-1900s Bronx neighborhood to his days spent learning how to operate a variety of powerful weapons with ease in the U.S. military. The reader is treated to Phillips' familiar poetic prose and stream of consciousness narrative in this haunting tale of violent alienation in modern-day America.
