= The Inverted Forest (Dalton novel) =

2011 novel by John Dalton

- First edition
- Author: John Dalton
- Language: English
- Publisher: Scribner
- Publication date: July 19, 2011
- Publication place: United States
- Media type: Print
- Pages: 325
- ISBN: 978-1-4165-9602-8

The Inverted Forest is the second novel by Missourian author John Dalton published in 2011 by Scribner. It was on the Beach Read list of New York Magazine's summer guide. The storyline based in part on Dalton's own experience as a counsellor at Camp Don Bosco in Hillsboro, Missouri, in the 1980s.

== Plot ==
The novel is set in 1996, the fictional Kinderman Summer Camp in Shannon County, Missouri, run by an elderly camp director. Two days before the opening of the camp the director fires most of the counsellors when he finds them naked in the small hours of the camp's swimming pool. Quickly the director manages to find enough counsellors to run the camp but rather than expecting children, the counsellors find responsibility for 104 severely developmentally disabled adults from the State Hospital. One of the counsellors is Wyatt Huddy with Apert Syndrome who has been living in a Salvation Army facility, having been rescued by them by his cruel sister. All his life he has been misjudged by his deformed features, but he manages to successfully fit in as a counsellor at the camp and is enamoured by the camp nurse Harriet. The counsellors battle with the camper's afflictions and sexuality. The camp manager Linda Rucker is then fired as rumours spread about her behaviour to the attractive lifeguard Christopher Waterhouse. Harriet has always been suspicious of Christopher but his behaviour to teenage camper Evie is brought to a head when Harriet accuses him of planning to be alone with Evie to abuse her on a trip out. Harriet asks Wayne to follow them, where Evie is found naked, Wayne then kills Christopher.

Part 2 of the novel starts in St. Louis 15 years later where Marcy thinks fondly back her time as a counsellor, and her relationship with Christopher and about the legal case concerning Wayne. The remaining camp sessions were cancelled after the death of Christopher as the counsellors recall their time at the camp including Wayne Huddy and Harriet.

== Reception ==
- Kirkus Reviews praises the novel: "Dalton's expert control of his material is impressive. His conclusion, set 15 years later, tenderly resolves both the moral and personal aspects of the story. Dealing carefully with controversial material, this is a fully populated, humane yet largely unsentimental narrative of lingering impact."
- Writing in Entertainment Weekly, Sara Vilkomerson gives the novel B+, "Dalton nimbly delves into his characters’ perspectives, uncovering past secrets and future dreams (and eventual disappointments). While some of what's described is anything but pleasant, reading it certainly is."
- The Indian Express was also mostly positive "Wyatt’s story bears some similarities to familiar coming-of-age camp narratives, and Dalton’s lush descriptive passages are sure to evoke fond memories of that time. But then Dalton gives his plot a vicious, chilling twist - and abruptly breaks away to Part Two, set 15 years later. No doubt I was meant to feel disoriented by this shift in both time and perspective, but because the second half of the novel begins from the point of view of a minor and not very likable character, it took several chapters for me to regain my reading momentum. And though I was slightly suspicious of Dalton's motives for the rest of the book, I admire the decision to tell the rest of Wyatt's story in this multiperspective way, and applaud his treatment of difficult subject matter without a shred of mawkishness"
