= Oldest Living Confederate Widow Tells All =

1989 novel by Allan Gurganus

- Author: Allan Gurganus
- Language: English
- Genre: Fiction
- Published: 1989
- Publication place: United States

Oldest Living Confederate Widow Tells All is a 1989 first novel by Allan Gurganus which was on the New York Times Best Seller list for eight months. It won the Sue Kaufman Prize from the American Academy of Arts and Letters, was a main selection of the Book-of-the-Month Club and sold over four million copies.

The novel is written as supposedly dictated to a visitor to the nursing home of ninety-nine-year-old Lucy Marsden, who was married around 1900 when she was 15 and her husband, Captain William Marsden, was 50. Through this motif, the novel explores issues of race and personal relationships in the historical context of the American South. According to the author's web site, "If Captain William Marsden was a veteran of the 'War for Southern Independence,' Lucy became a 'veteran of the veteran' with a unique perspective on Southern history and Southern manhood. Her story encompasses everything from the death of a Confederate boy soldier to the feisty narrator's daily battles in the Home — complete with visits from a mohawk-coiffed candy-striper."

== Stage and television adaptions ==
The book was made into a television miniseries, Oldest Living Confederate Widow Tells All, broadcast on CBS in 1994. Cicely Tyson won one of its four Emmy Awards as best supporting actress; other Emmy wins were for Hairstyling, Costume Design, and Art Direction for a Miniseries or special.

The book was adapted by Martin Tahse into a one-woman play, which was developed by the Old Globe Theatre, San Diego. The play premiered there in January 2003, with Ellen Burstyn starring. The play then opened on Broadway at the Longacre Theatre on November 17, 2003, and closed after one regular performance.
