= Brando Skyhorse =

American author

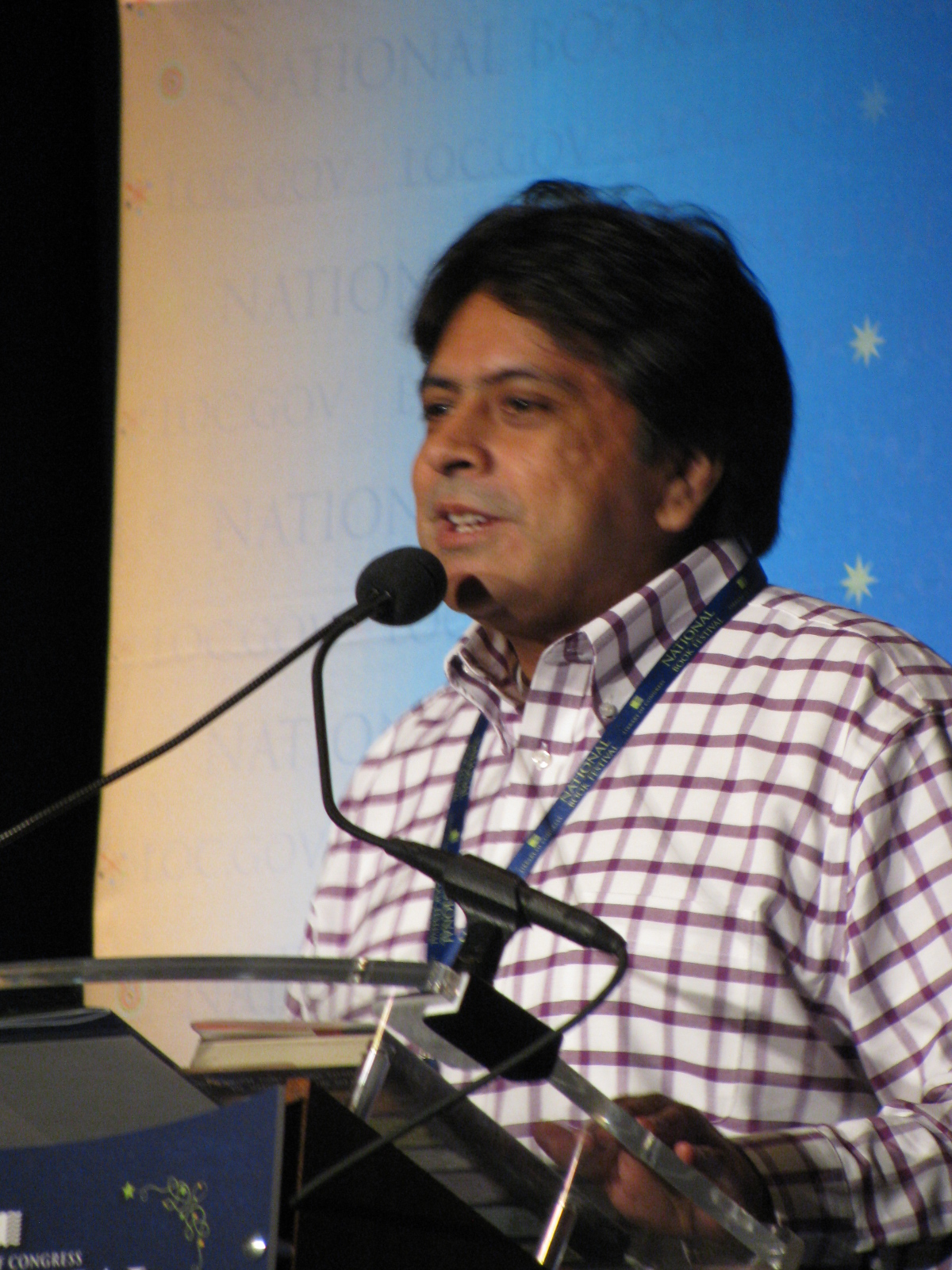
- Born: Echo Park, California, U.S.
- Education: Stanford University; University of California, Irvine
- Writing career
- Notable awards: Sue Kaufman Prize for First Fiction; PEN/Hemingway Award

Brando Skyhorse (born Brandon Kelly Ulloa) is an American author. He won the 2011 PEN/Hemingway Award and the 2011 Sue Kaufman Prize for First Fiction for his novel The Madonnas of Echo Park.

== Life ==
Skyhorse was born and raised in Echo Park, California and has degrees from Stanford University and from the MFA Writers' Workshop program at the University of California, Irvine.

He shared the story of his complex ethnic identity development a 2014 NBC.com feature, and later in an episode of the Snap Judgment podcast (#807 Born Identity; posted on March 24, 2017). He said that, through his childhood, his mother insisted they were Native Americans, and portrayed herself as a passionate activist for Native American rights. However, she later admitted this was not true: they were in fact both Mexican-American. She had adopted a Native American identity after being abandoned by Skyhorse's father, partly because she "just don’t want to be another Mexican girl in [heavily Latino] Echo Park", and to illustrate her belief that identity is a choice. Under his mother's assertive guidance, Skyhorse did things such as refusing to stand for the Pledge of Allegiance to protest the treatment of Native Americans. In his early teens, Skyhorse began suspecting his mother was lying about their Native American ancestry, but she resisted his questions about it. He continued to claim a Native American identity until her death in 1998, including on his application to Stanford University. He acknowledges feeling guilty and conflicted about this choice since then. Nonetheless, he also said that when he was 18, it would have been impossible for him to contradict his mother about their identity. He believes his story is an example of the complexity of racial and ethnic identity in the United States, and that it illustrates how adults affect their children's development of identity.

Skyhorse was a professional book editor prior to the success of Madonnas, which he wrote under the title Amexicans. Skyhorse Publishing, where he worked as an editor, is named after him. He has been awarded fellowships at Ucross Foundation, the Breadloaf Writers’ Conference, and was the 2014-2015 Jenny McKean Moore Writer-In-Washington at George Washington University.

Skyhorse is an Associate Professor of English at Indiana University Bloomington where he lives with his wife and three cats.

== Works ==
- The Madonnas of Echo Park: A Novel. Simon and Schuster. 8 February 2011. ISBN 978-1-4391-7084-7.
- Take This Man: A Memoir. Simon and Schuster. 3 June 2014. ISBN 978-1-4391-7087-8.
- My Name Is Iris. Simon and Schuster. 1 August 2023. ISBN 978-1-9821-7785-0
