= Solar Bones =

2016 novel by fiction Mike McCormack

- Author: Mike McCormack
- Language: English
- Genre: Literary fiction
- Publication date: 2016
- Publication place: Ireland

Solar Bones is a 2016 novel by Irish fiction writer Mike McCormack. The book is notable for featuring only a single sentence, with all events written as a recollection from the present.

The novel's plot revolves around Marcus Conway, a middle-aged engineer who has returned home on All Souls' Day, and is reminiscing about the events of his life while sitting at his kitchen table. Themes of the novel are: order and chaos, love and subsequent loss, and the ability of minor decisions to ripple and inevitably create large outcomes. The novel also comments on "contemporary Irish masculinity" as it discusses the various roles one faces as a husband, father, son, brother, colleague, and neighbor.

Solar Bones won the 2016 Goldsmiths Prize and the 2018 International Dublin Literary Award, and was longlisted for the 2017 Man Booker Prize. The novel appeared in the bestsellers charts in Ireland in June and July 2018. Hodges Figgis listed it as their third highest selling Irish novel of the decade 2010–2020.

== Plot summary ==
On All Soul's Day, the Angelus bell sets off a series of reminiscences in Marcus Conway, a middle-aged engineer sitting at the kitchen table awaiting the return of his wife. He remembers in his childhood a politician who will later become successful calling to his parents' house and his father outlining his prediction for the coming election, which turns out to be very accurate. He recalls the happiness early in his marriage, having sex with his wife in the same kitchen, as well as an affair he had while at a conference in Prague. He recalls playing video games with his son, then later Skyping with him as his son explores the Australian Outback. He compares the attitude of his son and daughter, the latter being more focused and diligent. In one of the longer episodes, he remembers an art exhibition of his daughter's in Galway, where newspaper headlines are written in blood, and a mist of blood floats through the air. This embarrasses him, and he runs outside into the rain. At dinner afterwards, his wife is the only one who drinks water, and she contracts cryptosporidiosis (there was an outbreak in that area due to poor water treatment). He nurses his wife through her long convalescence and she recovers.

As an engineer, he often came into conflict with politicians and builders with different priorities, especially during the Celtic Tiger, when there was a multitude of construction works. Different construction companies shared the contract to build a school, and multiple separate pours of concrete were made for the same foundation. The separate pours of concrete from the different suppliers did not mix properly, thus the foundation was unstable and the school building shows cracks soon afterwards. He was pressured to sign off on the works, but his conscience will not allow him. He has an argument on the subject on the telephone with an influential local. Marcus stops at a cafe and has a coffee though he knows he should not. Driving home, he has chest pains and stops the car to try to calm down. Late in the book, it is revealed that the narrator has been dead throughout it.
