= Oldest Living Confederate Widow Tells All (film) =

- Based on: Oldest Living Confederate Widow Tells All by Allan Gurganus
- Written by: Joyce Eliason
- Directed by: Ken Cameron
- Starring: Diane Lane; Donald Sutherland; Cicely Tyson; Anne Bancroft
- Music by: Mark Snow
- Country of origin: United States
- Original language: English

Production
- Executive producers: Frank Konigsberg; Larry Sanitsky
- Producer: Jack Clements
- Cinematography: Edward J. Pei
- Editors: Charles Bornstein; Tod Feuerman
- Running time: 184 minutes
- Production companies: Konigsberg/Sanitsky Company; RHI Entertainment

Original release
- Network: CBS
- Release: May 1 – May 3, 1994

Oldest Living Confederate Widow Tells All is a 1994 American television miniseries written by Joyce Eliason and based on the 1989 novel by Allan Gurganus. It was directed by Ken Cameron and starred Diane Lane, Donald Sutherland, Cicely Tyson and Anne Bancroft.

The miniseries won several Emmy Awards, including an Outstanding Supporting Actress award to Cicely Tyson. This miniseries was first aired in two parts on CBS on May 1 and 3, 1994.

== Plot ==
On her 99th birthday, Lucy Honicut Marsden (Anne Bancroft) recalls her life as the 14-year-old bride of a veteran of the American Civil War.

== Cast ==
- Diane Lane as young Lucy Honicut Marsden
- Donald Sutherland as Capt. William Marsden
- Cicely Tyson as Castalia, Marsden Family House Enslaved Maid
- Anne Bancroft as Lucy Marsden (age 99)
- Blythe Danner as Bianca Honicut
- E. G. Marshall as Prof. Taw, Old Folks Home Resident
