= Sue Kaufman Prize for First Fiction =

American literary award

The Sue Kaufman Prize for First Fiction is an American literary award presented by the American Academy of Arts and Letters for debut publications. The $5,000 prize is given for the best published first novel or collection of short stories in the preceding year. It was established in 1979 in memory of author Sue Kaufman.

== Past winners ==
Sue Kaufman Prize for First Fiction winners
Year	Author	Title	Ref.
1980	Jayne Anne Phillips	Black Tickets	
1981	Tom Lorenz	Guys Like Us	
1982	Ted Mooney	Easy Travel to Other Planets	
1983	Susanna Moore	My Old Sweetheart	
1984	Denis Johnson	Angels	
1985	Louise Erdrich	Love Medicine	
1986	Cecile Pineda	Face	
1987	Jeannette Haien	The All of It	
1988	Kaye Gibbons	Ellen Foster	
1989	Gary Krist	The Garden State	
1990	Allan Gurganus	Oldest Living Confederate Widow Tells All	
1991	Charles Palliser	The Quincunx	
1992	Alex Ullmann	Afghanistan	
1993	Francisco Goldman	The Long Night of White Chickens	
1994	Emile Capouya	In the Sparrow Hills	
1995	Jim Grimsley	Winter Birds	
1996	Peter Landesman	The Raven	
1997	Brad Watson	Last Days of the Dog-Men	
1998	Charles Frazier	Cold Mountain	
1999	Michael Byers	The Coast of Good Intentions	
2000	Nathan Englander	For the Relief of Unbearable Urges	
2001	Akhil Sharma	An Obedient Father	
2002	Don Lee	Yellow	
2003	Gabe Hudson	Dear Mr. President	
2004	Nell Freudenberger	Lucky Girls	
2005	John Dalton	Heaven Lake	
2006	Uzodinma Iweala	Beasts of No Nation	
2007	Tony D'Souza	Whiteman	
2008	Frances Hwang	Transparency	
2009	Charles Bock	Beautiful Children	
2010	Josh Weil	The New Valley	
2011	Brando Skyhorse	The Madonnas of Echo Park	
2012	Ismet Prcic	Shards	
2013	Kevin Powers	The Yellow Birds	
2014	Manuel Gonzales	The Miniature Wife	
2015	Michael Carroll	Little Reef and Other Stories	
2016	Kirstin Valdez Quade	Night at the Fiestas	
2017	Lee Clay Johnson	Nitro Mountain	
2018	Emily Fridlund	History of Wolves	
2019	Jane Delury	The Balcony	
2020	Isabella Hammad	The Parisian	
2021	Douglas Stuart	Shuggie Bain	
2022	Jackie Polzin	Brood	
2023	Morgan Talty	Night of the Living Rez	
2024	Taylor Koekkoek	Thrillville, USA	
2025	Nora Lange	Us Fools	
2026	C. Mallon	Dogs	
