= Cecile Pineda =

American author and dramatist (1932–2022)

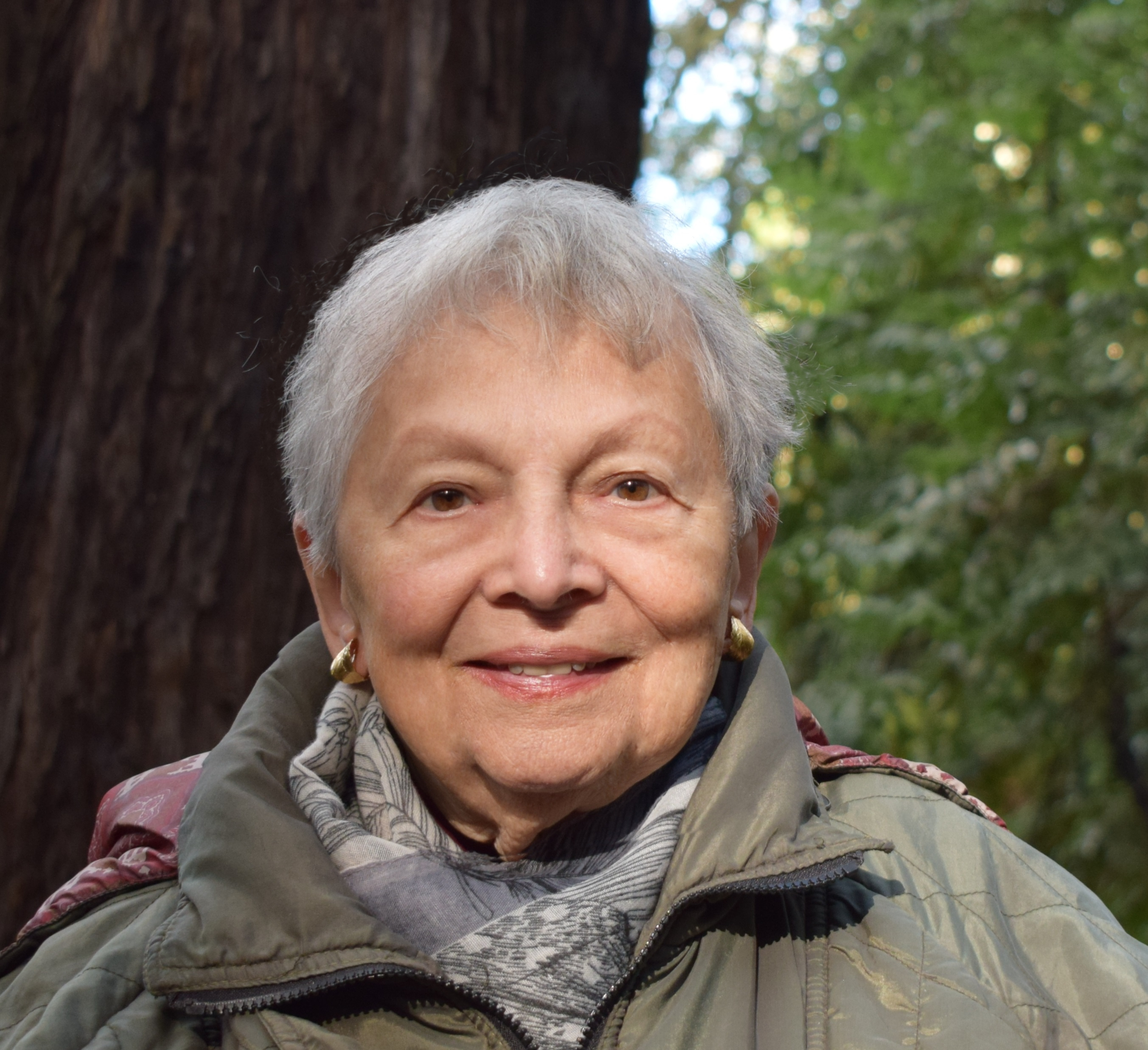
- Pineda in 2020
- Born: September 1932; Harlem, New York, U.S.
- Died: August 11, 2022 (aged 89); Berkeley, California, U.S.
- Education: San Francisco State University (MA)
- Occupations: Author; theatre director; playwright
- Known for: Writings, theater works
- Awards: Sue Kaufman Prize for First Fiction, Gold Medal of the Commonwealth Club of California
- Website: cecilepineda.com Devils Tango

Cecile Pineda (September 1932 – August 11, 2022) was an American author. Her novels have won numerous awards including the Sue Kaufman Prize for First Fiction and a Gold Medal from the Commonwealth Club of California in 1986 for Face, and a National Endowment for the Arts Creative Writing Fellowship.

== Biography ==
Pineda was a daughter of a Mexican professor of languages and a French-Swiss artist and teacher. In her autobiographical essay "Deracinated: the writer re-invents her sources" published in Máscaras, she states that her father, along with his father and brothers, fled the Mexican Revolution leaving his mother and sister behind. In 1961, she moved from New York City to San Francisco, California, where she has spent most of her career as a writer and theater maker. In 1969, Pineda founded The Theater of Man which she directed from 1969 to 1981. Performance pieces were developed in an intense rehearsal process in which actors worked with composers, designers, choreographers, playwrights, and sculptors under her direction. Productions included her redaction of T. S. Eliot's Murder in the Cathedral, Claude van Itallie's The Serpent, After Eurydice, Stoneground, based on Mujica-Lainz' Bomarzo, The Trial, after Franz Kafka, and Threesomes.

She completed her theater studies in 1970, taking an advanced M.A. degree in theater from San Francisco State University. The Cecile Pineda Papers, 1959–to the present, include a collection of the author's original correspondence, manuscripts, journals, reviews, videos, drafts, rehearsal logs, and posters documenting her career in both literature and theater. The collection is housed at Stanford University, occupying more than 29 feet (9 m). Her academic appointments include positions as writer in residence at San Diego State University and Mills College in Oakland, California, and a Distinguished Regents' Lectureship at the University of California, Berkeley.

An avid reader from childhood, Pineda cites Samuel Beckett, Kōbō Abe, J. M. Coetzee, Gabriel García Márquez, and Franz Kafka as writers whose work has most influenced her.

"I do not think anymore that writing—mine or another’s—can change the world," Pineda told The Bloomsbury Review in an interview in 2004. "Perhaps in their small way, writers can answer for those who are voiceless in their extreme deprivation and suffering. But at best, in the very smallest scheme, writing can provide a moment of grace, both for her who writes and him who reads, in a very dark world."

== Awards and recognition ==
- Sue Kaufman Prize for First Fiction
- 1986, Gold Medal from the Commonwealth Club of California
- National Endowment for the Arts Creative Writing Fellowship

== Novels ==
Summaries

Face

Cecile Pineda's debut novel, Face, which won the Sue Kaufman Prize for First Fiction awarded by the American Academy and Institute of Arts and Letters, proposes a protagonist who suffers a catastrophic facial accident. It addresses issues having to do with identity. "When I read Face in 1985, it struck me as an extraordinary achievement, all the more extraordinary for being a first novel. Rereading it has not changed my estimate....Face continues to haunt me." —J.M. Coetzee, Nobel Prize, 2003.

Frieze

Frieze was published soon after in 1987. Set in 9th Century India and Java, it questions the role of the individual artist in a society, which is at once exploitative and oppressive.

The Love Queen of the Amazon

Published in 1992, with the assistance of a National Endowment of the Arts Writing Fellowship, Pineda's comic novel, The Love Queen of the Amazon, was named Notable Book of the Year by The New York Times. Its protagonist, Ana Magdelena Figeruoa is awarded in a brokered marriage to a celebrated Latin American man of letters who charges her with providing him with three meals a day and a clean change of underwear while he repairs to his aerie to compose the Great Latin American novel of the Boom Years. The novel is a send-up of hemispheric politics and magic realism. "Ana Magdalena Figueroa is one of the few great Latin heroines not created by the male imagination. Cecile Pineda has enhanced the roster of modern literature's most remarkable female characters with her brilliantly drawn portrait." —Richard Martins, Chicago Tribune, March 8, 1992.

Fishlight: A Dream of Childhood

Fishlight: A Dream of Childhood is Pineda's fictional memoir told in the voice of a five-year-old. Published by Wings Press in 2001, it explores the imaginative formation of the future writer.

Bardo99

In 2002, Pineda published the first of her mononovels. Cast as the protagonist's dying hallucination, Bardo 99 is the author's encounter with some of the waning century's most apocalyptic events.

Redoubt

Pineda followed the publication of Bardo 99 with a second mononovel in 2004. Redoubt follows the stream of consciousness of a sentry standing guard in a desert outpost located somewhere close to or distant from an unnamed capital. It is Pineda's meditation on the state of being born female. "Redoubt is as close as I've ever come to "being one" with a woman, through the pages of a book." —Rudy Ch. Garcia writing in La Bloga, December 2005.

== Non-Fiction Books ==
Devil's Tango: How I Learned the Fukushima Step by Step (March 2012)

(ISBN 9781609402365). Available in all formats at Independent Publishers Group

Apology to a Whale: Words to Mend a World (Sep 2015)

(ISBN 9781609404406). Available in all formats at Independent Publishers Group

Three Tides (Oct 2016)

(ISBN 9780930324926) Available in all formats at Independent Publishers Group

Entry Without Inspection A Writer's Life in El Norte (Nov 2020)

(ISBN 9780820358468) Available from University of Georgia Press

== Plays ==
Like Snow Melting in Water (2008)

Like Snow Melting in Water is based on a true story. Set in the contemporary rice-growing village of Ogama on the Sea of Japan, it chronicles the collapse of an agrarian culture and sale of the village to The Tashima Company, a toxic waste disposal company.
