= Emile Capouya =

American writer

- Born: August 13, 1925; Manhattan, New York, United States
- Died: October 13, 2005 (aged 80); East Meredith, United States
- Education: Columbia University
- Occupations: Essayist and critic
- Notable work: In the Sparrow Hills (1993)
- Awards: Sue Kaufman Prize for First Fiction (1994)

Emile Capouya (August 13, 1925 – October 13, 2005) was an American essayist, critic, and writer. His book In the Sparrow Hills won the Sue Kaufman Prize of the American Academy and Institute of Arts and Letters. Capouya was born in Manhattan in 1925 and grew up in the Bronx.

== Life ==
Capouya studied at Columbia University in New York City and started his working life at New Directions. From 1969 to 1981, he was Literary Editor of The Nation magazine and wrote for The New American Review, The New York Times and The Saturday Review. Capouya published the work of Ezra Pound, Tennessee Williams, Jean-Paul Sartre and James Joyce. In 1971, he was appointed associate professor of English at Baruch College, where he taught for ten years.

In 1993, he published his first book, In the Sparrow Hills, a compilation of short stories based on his time with Handelsmarine in World War II. It won the Sue Kaufman Prize for First Fiction.

In 1968, he married Keitha Capouya who is a publisher. In 1986, they founded New Amsterdam Books, publishing Literary fiction.

== Literature ==
- In the Sparrow Hills, Algonquin Books 1993, ISBN 0-945575-62-9
- Ismail Kadare, Emile Capouya: Albanian Spring: The Anatomy of Tyranny, Saqi Books 1994, ISBN 0-86356-253-1
- Emile Capouya, Keitha Capouya: Classic English Love Poems, Hippocrene Books 1999, ISBN 0-7818-0572-4
- The Rising of the Moon, Lyons Press 2003, ISBN 1-58574-664-9
