= John Dalton (author) =

American author

- Education: Iowa Writers' Workshop
- Occupation: Author
- Children: 2
- Writing career
- Notable awards: Sue Kaufman Prize for First Fiction (2005)

John Dalton is an American author. His first novel, Heaven Lake, won the 2005 Sue Kaufman Prize from the American Academy of Arts and Letters and the 2004 Barnes & Noble Discover Award in Fiction.

Dalton grew up near St. Louis, Missouri, as the youngest of seven children. He lived for a time in Douliou City, Taiwan, the setting for his first novel, during the late 1980s, and travelled extensively in mainland China and Asia.

He attended the Iowa Writers' Workshop in the 1990s but has now returned to St. Louis, where he lives with his wife and two daughters. He is the director of the MFA program in Creative Writing at the University of Missouri–St. Louis.

== Bibliography ==
=== Novels ===
- Heaven Lake (2004)
- The Inverted Forest (2011)
