= White People (short story collection) =

1991 short story collection by author Allan Gurganus

- First edition
- Author: Allan Gurganus
- Language: English
- Genre: Fiction, short story collection
- Published: 1991
- Publisher: Alfred A. Knopf
- Publication place: United States
- Pages: 252

White People is a 1991 short story collection by author Allan Gurganus.

== Overview ==
A collection of eleven short stories about people white and not white from the modern Southern United States.
