= The Prophet of Zongo Street =

2005 collection of short stories by Mohammed Naseehu Ali

- First edition
- Author: Mohammed Naseehu Ali
- Language: English
- Publisher: HarperCollins
- Publication date: 26 July 2005
- Publication place: United States
- Media type: Print
- ISBN: 0061977047

The Prophet of Zongo Street is a collection of short stories by Ghanaian author Mohammed Naseehu Ali, first published in 2005. Set in two neighbourhoods, Zongo Street in West Africa and on the streets of New York City, the stories give a modern twist to African folklore and myths. The stories, although fictional, are based on Mohammed Ali's experiences living in the neighbourhood of Zongo, located in the city of Kumasi. Mohammed Ali says he wants to use this book to document the stories and lives of his people, so that there is proof of their civilization and way of life.

== Story Summaries ==
=== The Story of Day and Night ===
Uwargida shares a folklore tale to the community children. The story begins with Baadiya, a woman mocked for being infertile. She meets Kantamanto, the oracle of the slippery sand, who explains that he is unable to help her bear children. Kantamanto gives her one of his own children who has malicious intent. After three months, her son Mewuya, a devil child, arrives. Due to the child's evil tendencies, Kantmanto prepares to defend the village. The change of day and night is the result of the devil child and Kantmanto battling each other through light and dark.

=== The Prophet of Zongo Street ===
Kumi is an educated and avid reader. He preaches sermons regarding the effects of the Western influences on the Ghanaian culture. During a great storm, Kumi preaches while risking his life and is found dead. At the funeral, the narrator, who has come to understand Kumi's book, memorializes him by reading a passage from it. The nine year old boy listens to him and finds interest in what kumi says.

=== Live In ===
Shatu is a live-in maid for Marge Hammers, an elderly woman residing in Long Island, New York. At the grocers, Shatu realizes she has lost two hundred dollars and goes home to explain the situation to Marge, who then gives her more money to finish her errands. Shatu learns that Marge then complained to Home Health Care, reporting that Shatu stole from her. Shatu makes a promise at the end of the story that she does not want to grow old or die in Long Island.

=== The Manhood Test ===
Mr. Rafique dreads the day of the Manhood Test where he and his wife, Zulaikha, must prove that they are an unfit married couple in order to receive a divorce. After they were married, their relationship became strained as it was not consummated. When the couple spends time apart, their sexual desires are heightened but they are left unsatisfied. On the day of the manhood test, Mr. Rafique prays to Allah. Mr. Rafique and Zulaikha arrive at the Chief's palace for the manhood test and find a new found respect for one another.

=== The True Aryan ===
A young musician climbs into a cab after finishing work in Manhattan. The driver proudly exclaims that he is Armenian and learns that the musician is Ghanaian. Initially, the musician is hostile towards the driver as most cab drivers will not pick him up because he is black. The driver discusses Armenian history and claims that Armenians are the first Caucasians and true Aryans. He tells the musician that Armenians "never stop fighting" as an encouragement. When the musician gets out of the cab, the driver says "savat tanem," which he explains means "I'll take your pain."

=== Ward G4 ===
The narrator, Yaro, explains that when he was eight, he realized he could predict death. He recounts his mother attempting to treat his Malaria at home until his condition worsened. He was taken to the hospital and placed in the terminal ward with three other patients. One patient, Bonifice, was never seen as he remained under a pile of blankets. One night, Yaro woke up to Bonifice sitting upright in his bed. He looked into Bonifice's eyes and saw Azara-il: death, staring back at him and knew Bonifice would soon die. The next day, Yaro is told he may go home. As he waited, he noticed Bonifice's empty bed and understood that Azara-il had taken him.

=== Rachmaninov ===
Felix, a Ghanaian artist, attends an art opening with a group of people in Manhattan. The group is discusses money when a woman named Greta joins them. The newly expanded group heads to a bar for drinks. While waiting outside, they begin smoking marijuana, and Greta and Felix become closer. Felix and Greta decide to split from the group and go back to a friend's apartment to have sex and smoke more marijuana while "Rachmaninov" plays in the background. The couple has a bad reaction to the marijuana, and Greta passes out. Felix decides to have sex with her to try and wake her up. Greta awakens and yells as the music continues to play.

=== Mallam Sile ===
Mallam Sile is the owner of a popular tea shop. He travels to his home town and returns with his new wife, Abeeba. Abeeba is a strong woman and dislikes how the people of Zongo Street treat her husband. Abeeba decides to confront one of the customers, a local bully named Samandu, and beats him until he pays his debt. When Sile hears the news he thanks Allah for Samandu's change of heart, not realizing it was Abeeba who forced him to pay.

=== Faith ===
Suf-yan is sitting in his apartment when the floors cave in and he falls six stories. He lands in a barren desert and realizes Brooklyn has vanished. Thousands of naked adults and children appear and Suf-yan recognizes them as friends and family members. He realizes that it is Judgement Day. As he walks, an Archangel begins calling people from the crowd and sends them to Heaven or Hell. Suf-yan is convinced he will go to Hell. The Archangel reviews Suf-yan's life and decides to send him to Heaven. Suf-yan stays in paradise eternally.

=== Man Pass Man ===
Suraju is an alcoholic and a gambler living on Zongo Street. While sitting in front of a church, he sees a witch walking and the sight inspires his next idea to make money. Although he is well-dressed, no one knows where his money comes from. One night, Suraju starts screaming through the streets. The townsfolk ask why he is afraid and Suraju explains the source of his money: he calls taxi drivers, dresses as a ghost, scares them, and robs them. Suraju explains that one driver was in fact a ghost who showed him to Hell. After telling his story, Suraju begins screaming again.

== Main characters ==
=== The Story of Day and Night ===
- Uwargida: "Mother of the house." Oldest wife and grandmother.
- Baadiya: A childless mother mocked by other wives. She asks Kentamonto for a baby and is told she will receive a devil child in three months.
- Kantamonto: Oracle of the slippery sand. He defends the village against Mewuya and creates night.
- Mewuya: Devil child. Plays with knives and has the ability to control people. He kills Baadiya and all other animals and humans in the village. He fights Kantamonto and creates day.

=== The Prophet of Zongo Street ===
- Kumi: A well-dressed, educated man. He is liked by people at first but eventually assumed to be mad. He preached sermons in the street.
- Narrator: Fourteen years old at the time of Kumi's Death. He is given a book by Kumi at age thirteen.

=== Live-In ===
- Shatu: A live-in maid taking orders from Roger.
- Marge: The old woman Shatu cares for. She is resistant to Shatu's care.

=== The Manhood Test ===
- Mr. Rafique: Husband to Zulaikha. He is a well-dressed, educated man.
- Zulaikha: Wife to Mr. Rafique. She is beautiful and sought after by multiple men.

=== The True Aryan ===
- Narrator: A Ghanaian musician who plays in an Afro-Jazz quintet.
- Sarkis: An Armenian cab driver.

=== Ward G4 ===
- Yaro: A young boy who can predict death. He is sick with malaria.
- Mother: Yaro's mother. She cares for him while he is sick.
- Bonifice: The third patient in Ward G4 who dies after Yaro's prediction.
- Azara-il: The female embodiment of death.

=== Rachmaninov ===
- Felix: A poor Ghanaian artist living in Manhattan.
- Greta: A wealthy white artist with blonde hair and blue eyes. She also lives in Manhattan.

=== Mallam Sile ===
- Mallam Sile: A man nicknamed "pygmy" selling beverages on Zongo Street.
- Abeeba: A woman Sile claims is his wife. She is kind to customers and made fun of for being overweight. She is nicknamed man-checker for beating up Samadu.
- Samadu: The neighbourhood tough guy. He is forced by Samadu to pay his debts to Sile.

=== Faith ===
- Suf-yan: The main character who worries he will go to hell because he is not a "model Muslim."
- Archangel: An angel who decides whether humans go to heaven or hell.

=== Man Pass Man ===
- Suraju: The trickster of Zongo street always scheming to make money.
- Ghost-driver: The ghost who drives Suraju's cab and shows him Hell.

== Themes and motifs ==
=== Death ===
The role of the supernatural, specifically pertaining to death, is heavily explored through the stories' spiritual connotations. For example, Ward G4 surrounds the Ghanaian belief of Azara-il, the female embodiment of death. Yaro's belief in Azara-il and his ability to predict death allude to the Ghanaian spirituality and African Folklore embedded within the novel.

=== Immigration into Western Culture ===
A major theme in this book involves the struggle for Ghanaian immigrants who are moving to a Western society, which is generally for financial benefit or further opportunity for education or work. An example of this theme is demonstrated in Rachmaninov when Felix moves to Manhattan to pursue a career in art. However, when he becomes entangled in the social aspects of Western culture, he finds himself failing financially and his career stalls. Similarly, the theme of immigration to Western culture is evident within Ali's writing style. In Mallam Sile, Ali explains Ghanaian terminology such as "juju" to aid in the Western reader's understanding of the novel.

=== Race, Religion, Historical Context ===
Mohammed Ali's book is heavily influenced by race, religion and historical context. In his book, many of the characters, specifically Ghanaian Americans, struggle with understanding and exploring their Islamic identity and beliefs, while also combatting assimilation into Western-American culture. This is exemplified in Faith, when Suf-yan's life in Brooklyn continues to distance him from his culture and the values he was taught.

Race and its significance in terms of social hierarchy are also brought to the readers' attention in the story, Live In, when Shatu is forced to live and work in America in order to send money home. The job she receives, however, is of a low ranking quality in the eyes of Westerners and puts her at a much lower pay grade than other jobs.

=== African Diaspora ===
This book illustrates the African Diaspora, which refers to the movement of peoples from Africa into the West, throughout various stories in the book. Examples of African diaspora can be found in the story Live In through Shatu's work as a maid for an American woman as a means to send funds to her family in Ghana. A second example of African diaspora can be seen in the story Faith, when Suf-yan abandons his culture and religion after immigrating to the U.S. Mohamed Naseehu Ali's book examines two forms of immigration, leaving home and returning home.
