= Mike McCormack (writer) =

Irish novelist and short-story writer (born 1965)

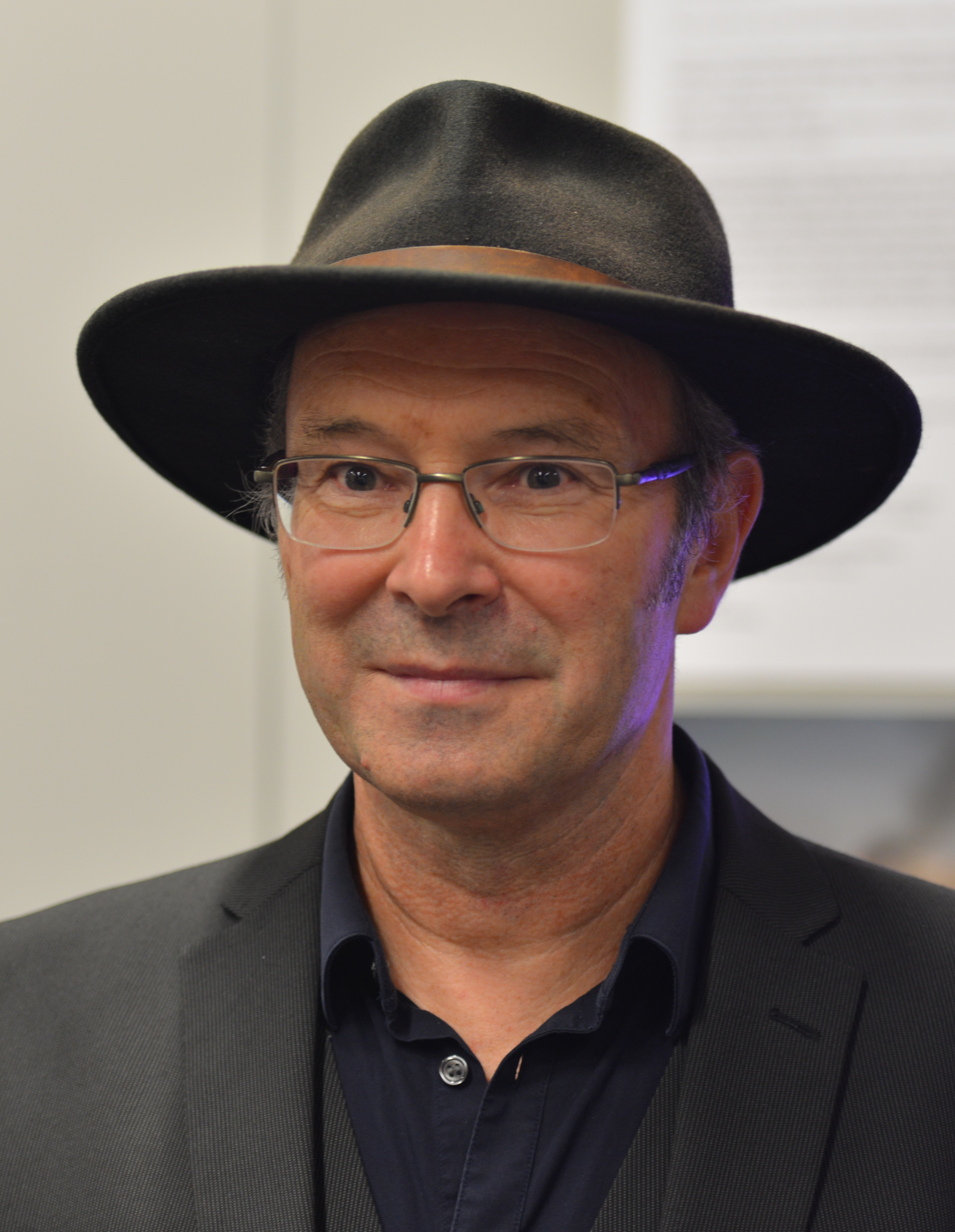
- McCormack at the 2017 Gothenburg Book Fair
- Born: 1965 (age 60–61); London, England
- Education: University College Galway (UCG)
- Occupations: Novelist, short story writer
- Writing career
- Notable works: Notes from a Coma (2005); Solar Bones (2016)
- Notable awards: Rooney Prize for Irish Literature (1996); Goldsmiths Prize (2016); International Dublin Literary Award (2018)

Mike McCormack (born 1965) is an Irish novelist and short-story writer. He has published two collections of short stories, Getting It In the Head and Forensic Songs, and four novels: Crowe's Requiem, Notes from a Coma, Solar Bones, and This Plague of Souls. He has won the Rooney Prize for Irish Literature, the Goldsmiths Prize, and the International Dublin Literary Award. He was described as "a disgracefully neglected writer" early in his career, but the success of some of his later works and his tenure as a writing educator have brought him wide recognition today.

== Life and education ==
McCormack was born in London. He grew up on a farm in Louisburgh, County Mayo, and studied English and philosophy at the University of Galway.

He lives in Galway with his wife Maeve, where he works as a lecturer and director of the University of Galway's MA in Creative Writing.

== Career ==
McCormack's first short story collection, Getting It in the Head, was published in 1996. It was awarded the Rooney Prize for Irish Literature, awarded to Irish writers under the age of 40. In 1998, the collection was voted a New York Times Notable Book of the Year. A story from the collection, "The Terms", was adapted into a short film directed by Johnny O'Reilly released in 2000. It won six awards, including Best Short Film at the Palm Springs International Festival of Short Films, the Woodstock Film Festival, and the Chlotrudis Awards. The same story was adapted as a short film a second time in 2010, with director Jason LaMotte. It won awards at the Tribeca Festival and the Action On Film International Film Festival.

McCormack's first novel, Crowe's Requiem, was published in 1998. In it, John Crowe, who suffers from the ageing disease progeria, escapes from his isolated rural childhood to the city, where he enters into a tumultuous relationship with a fellow student, which leads to him taking part in a risky medical trial.

McCormack's second novel, Notes from a Coma (2006), is set in a floating prison, where the prisoners are kept in maintained comas. It was shortlisted for the Irish Book of the Year Award. In 2010, John Waters in The Irish Times described it as "the greatest Irish novel of the decade just ended". It took McCormack seven years to write the book. It is currently on the Senior Cycle reading list for Leaving Certificate English.

In May 2016, Dublin publisher Tramp Press published McCormack's third novel Solar Bones. Set in rural Ireland, it follows the thoughts of a civil engineer, Marcus, and is unusual in being written as a single long sentence. It was named Novel of the Year and An Post Irish Book of the Year by the Irish Book Awards. It went on to win the 2018 Goldsmiths Prize. In June 2018, the novel won the International Dublin Literary Award of €100,000, the richest literary prize in the world for a single novel published in English.

McCormack's fourth novel, This Plague of Souls, was published in 2023. It describes a man returning to rural Ireland after a period in prison, to find his family house mysteriously empty.

MacCormack was elected to Aosdána in 2018. In 2019, he was inducted into the Hennessy Literary Awards Hall of Fame.

== Bibliography ==
=== Short fiction collections ===
- 1996 – Getting It in the Head
- 2012 – Forensic Songs

=== Novels ===
- 1998 – Crowe's Requiem
- 2005 – Notes from a Coma
- 2016 – Solar Bones
- 2023 – This Plague of Souls

== See also ==
- List of members of Aosdána
