= Jayne Anne Phillips =

American writer

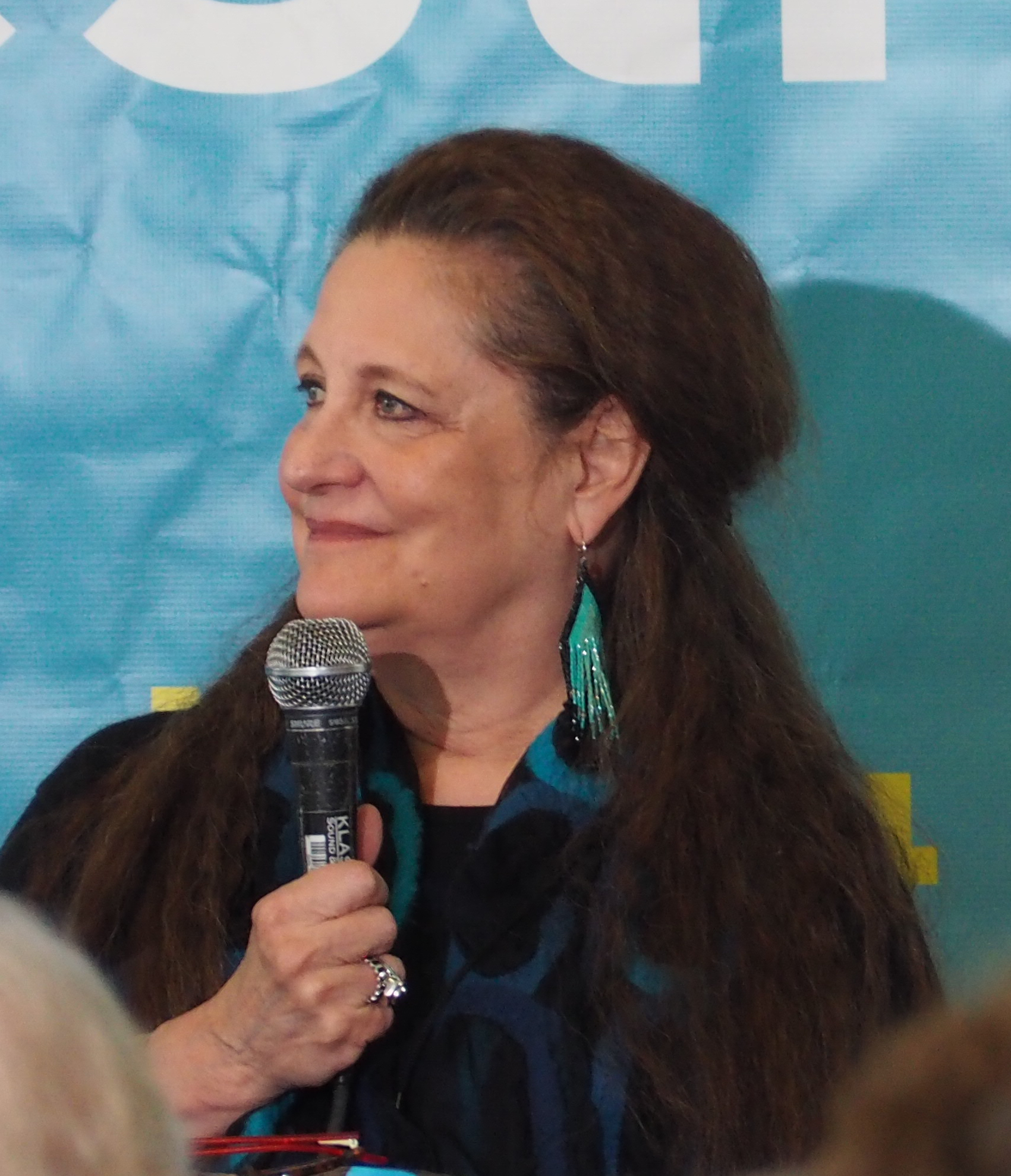
- Born: July 19, 1952 (age 74); Buckhannon, West Virginia, U.S.
- Education: West Virginia University (BA); University of Iowa (MFA)
- Occupations: Writer, professor at Rutgers University-Newark
- Writing career
- Years active: 1976–present
- Genres: Short Story, fiction, Essay
- Notable works: Black Tickets, Machine Dreams, Lark & Termite, Quiet Dell, Night Watch
- Notable awards: 1980 Sue Kaufman Prize for First Fiction; 2009 Heartland Prize; 2024 Pulitzer Prize for Fiction
- Website: jayneannephillips.com

Jayne Anne Phillips (born July 19, 1952) is an American novelist and short story writer who was born in the small town of Buckhannon, West Virginia. She was a professor of English at Rutgers-Newark from 2005 to 2020 and helped establish the MFA program at Rutgers University-Newark.

== Education ==
Phillips graduated from West Virginia University, earning a B.A. in 1974, and later received an M.F.A. in fiction from the Iowa Writers' Workshop at the University of Iowa.

== Teaching ==
Phillips has held teaching positions at several colleges and universities, including Harvard University, Williams College, Brandeis University, and Boston University. She is currently Professor of English and founder/director of the Rutgers University–Newark Master of Fine Arts in Creative Writing Program. In 2007, The Atlantic magazine named Phillips' MFA program at Rutgers–Newark in its list of "Five Up-and-Coming" creative writing programs in the United States.

== Writing career ==
=== Early career ===
In the mid-1970s, Phillips left West Virginia for California, embarking on a cross-country trip in the course of which she had numerous jobs, experiences, and encounters that would greatly influence her fiction, with its focus on lonely, lost souls and struggling survivors.

In 1976, Truck Press published her first short story collection Sweethearts, for which Phillips earned a Pushcart Prize and the Coordinating Council of Literary Magazines Fels Award.

Sweethearts was followed in 1978 by a second small-press collection, Counting, issued by Vehicle Editions. Counting earned Phillips greater recognition and the St. Lawrence Award.

Her next collection, Black Tickets, published by Delacorte/Seymour Lawrence in 1979 when she was 26, was her first book of stories and brought her national attention as a talented and important writer. Black Tickets contained three types of stories: one-page fictions, inner soliloquies, and family dramas. These stories focused on the characters' loneliness, alienation, and unsuccessful search for happiness. Black Tickets is mentioned in the 2006 lectures for the Modern Scholar series installment From Here to Infinity, by Professor Michael D. C. Drout, who refers to her style —— he asserts it had a direct influence on William Gibson's 1984 cyberpunk novel Neuromancer — as a "headlong rush of story and description". Called "the unmistakable work of early genius" by Tillie Olsen, Black Tickets was praised by Raymond Carver: "These stories of America's disenfranchised – men and women light-years away from the American Dream – are quite unlike any in our literature ... this book is a crooked beauty." Black Tickets was awarded the Sue Kaufman Prize for First Fiction by the American Academy and Institute of Arts and Letters.

In 1984, Phillips published her first novel, Machine Dreams, "a remarkable novelistic debut and an enduring literary achievement," according to the New York Times. Machine Dreams is a chronicle of the Hampson family from World War II to the Vietnam War. A National Book Critics Circle Award Finalist in Fiction, it was named one of 12 Best Books of the Year cited by the New York Times. It appeared on several Bestseller lists and was optioned as a film by actor Jessica Lange, who wrote the screenplay. Nobel Prize winner Nadine Gordimer said that Machine Dreams "reaches one's deepest emotions. No number of books read or films seen can deaden one to the intimate act of art by which this wonderful young writer has penetrated the definitive experience of her generation." Fast Lanes, a 1987 collection of ten stories, all first-person narratives, was praised as work by a writer "in love with the American language." One of the stories from Fast Lanes, "Rayme," had been published in 1984 in Granta's Dirty Realism issue.

In 1994, Phillips published her second novel, Shelter, a portrait of the loss of innocence at a West Virginia girls' camp in the summer of 1963. Called "a rich, vivid novel of moral and psychological complexity destined to stand alongside works by Faulkner and other Southern masters" (Vanity Fair) and "a defiant, frighteningly beautiful novel as disturbing as its setting, Shelter feels like Phillips' bid for immortality" (Harper's Bazaar). Shelter was awarded an Academy Award in Literature by the American Academy and Institute of Arts and Letters.

=== Later career ===
Phillips' next novel was MotherKind (2000), winner of the Massachusetts Book Award, a story of intergenerational love and struggles within a family facing many changes. It is praised as one of the best novels about mothers and infants and the mother/daughter bond.

Lark and Termite, her fourth novel, was published by Knopf in 2009 to positive reviews and was selected as one of five finalists for the National Book Award in fiction. Lark and Termite was also a Finalist for the National Book Critics Circle in Fiction; Lark et Termite (French translation by Marc Amfreville) was a Finalist for the Prix de Medici Etrangers (Paris).

Quiet Dell, Phillips' fifth novel, based on the true story of the 1931 murders of Chicago widow Asta Eicher and her three children in the hamlet of Quiet Dell, West Virginia, is a fictional portrayal of one of the nation's first sensationalized serial murders. Quiet Dell takes as its protagonist nine-year-old Annabel Eicher (victim, with her family, of con man Harry Powers, who found his victims through Depression-era matrimonial agencies) and Emily Thornhill, a Chicago Tribune journalist who commits herself to finding justice for the Eichers. A Kirkus Review Fiction Pick of the Year and Wall Street Journal Best Book of the Year, Quiet Dell was called "a story both splendid and irreparably sad" by the Chicago Tribune: "As Phillips has proved throughout her decades of fiction writing, there is evil in the world but there are some who will stand in its way." Quiet Dell was praised by the Philadelphia Review of Books: "It is the texture of the telling that elevates this recounting from true crime to the realm of literary eminence."

Phillips' works have been translated and published in twelve foreign languages.

== Awards and honours ==
She is the recipient of a Guggenheim Fellowship, two National Endowment for the Arts Fellowships, a Bunting Fellowship from the Bunting Institute of Radcliffe College, a Rockefeller Foundation Bellagio Fellowship, and numerous other awards. In 2024, she was awarded the Pulitzer Prize for Fiction for her novel Night Watch.

== Selected works ==
=== Short fiction ===
- Sweethearts (1976), prose vignettes
- Counting (1978), prose vignettes
- Black Tickets (1979), short story collection
- How Mickey Made It (1981), short story
- The Secret Country (1982), short story
- Fast Lanes (1987), short story collection

=== Novels ===
- Machine Dreams (1984)
- Shelter (1994)
- MotherKind (2000)
- Lark and Termite (2009)
- Quiet Dell (2013)
- Night Watch (2023)
