= Mohammed Naseehu Ali =

Ghanaian-born writer (born 1971)

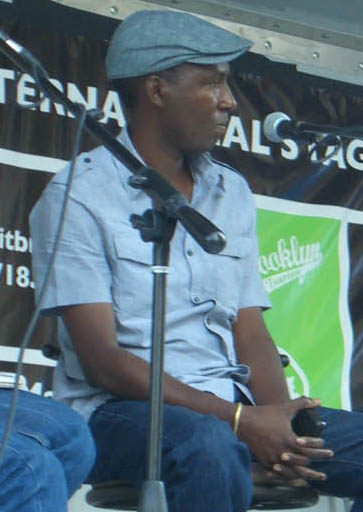
- Ali at the 2009 Brooklyn Book Festival.
- Born: 1971 (age 54–55)
- Occupations: Novelist, short story writer
- Writing career
- Genres: Short story writer, non-fiction

Mohammed Naseehu Ali (born 1971) is a Ghanaian-born writer based in New York City.

== Biography ==
Born in Kumasi, Ghana, Ali went to the United States in 1988 to study.

His first book, a collection of short stories titled The Prophet of Zongo Street, was published in 2006 and received positive reviews. Ali has acknowledged being influenced in the writing of this book by V. S. Naipaul's Miguel Street. He has published short stories and non-fiction essays in several publications, including The New Yorker, the New York Times, Mississippi Review, BOMB, Gathering of the Tribes, and Essence. Ali now lives in Brooklyn, New York.
