= History of Wolves =

2017 debut novel by Emily Fridlund

- First-edition cover
- Author: Emily Fridlund
- Language: English
- Genre: Fiction, Coming of Age, Psychological, Thriller
- Set in: Minnesota
- Publisher: Grove Atlantic
- Publication date: January 2017
- Publication place: United States of America
- ISBN: 978-1-4746-0294-5
- Preceded by: Catapult

History of Wolves is a psychological fiction novel published in 2017 written by American author Emily Fridlund. The novel blends the genres of bildungsroman and thriller to tell the story of a teen navigating through life-altering events. The novel is told from the perspective of the protagonist, Madeline Furston (Linda), as an adult recounting the events that occurred during the summer when she was fifteen.

Initially, the novel's first chapter was a stand-alone short story composed for a writing workshop at the University of Southern California. The short story was published in Southwest Review and won the 2013 McGinnis-Ritchie Award for fiction. Fridlund decided to expand the short story and completed History of Wolves as her debut novel.

The novel takes place in rural Minnesota and follows Linda as an outcast in her small town and how she reacts to situations beyond her control or comprehension.

== Plot summary ==
As a 37-year-old woman, the events of History of Wolves are a recount of a summer when Linda was a teenager.

Linda grew up in an abandoned commune in rural Minnesota with her parents; her mother who she suspected to not be her biological parent, and her emotionally unattached father. Her poor relationship with her parents coupled with her geographical isolation, as she lived surrounded by forest, resulted in Linda being an emotionally distant teen who struggled to effectively communicate and form meaningful connections. Linda was a complete outsider at school and was called names such as “Freak” and “Commie”.

Linda was drawn to her mysterious and beautiful classmate, Lily, and her history teacher, Mr. Grierson. Mr. Grierson seemed to pay special attention to Lily, a fact that Linda was acutely aware of. Though he favoured Lily, Mr. Grierson also took a special interest in Linda, offering her a place in the History Odyssey in which she unconventionally chose to do the history of wolves. In the car driving home from the event, Linda attempted to kiss Mr. Grierson, however, he ignored the act. Linda soon found out that Mr. Grierson was fired from his previous school for accusations of paedophilia, and he was also caught with possession of child pornography. Linda's school fired Mr. Grierson and rumours started spreading that Mr. Grierson had a sexual encounter with Lily. These accusations of sexual assault made Linda become more intrigued by Lily, although she also resented her as she believed these accusations to be false.

Linda was utterly alone, at home and at school, until the Gardner family moved into a house across the lake. She was immediately drawn to the young mother, Patra, and her son, Paul. Linda agreed to babysit Paul whilst his father, Leo, was out of town and Patra was editing Leo's manuscript. She formed an immediate connection with Paul and no longer felt alone. However, Linda soon noticed that Paul was ill; he was weak, exhausted, and grey in skin tone. When Leo returned, Linda mentioned that she had noticed Paul's sickness but quickly learned not to speak of it. Leo and Patra practiced Christian Science, meaning they did not believe in the physicality of human existence, nor in medicine. Leo questioned Linda's core beliefs in an effort to sway her to believe in his values, resulting in Linda growing increasingly worried about Paul as she noticed his was deteriorating. Even so, Linda did not say anything about Paul's decline in health as she held trust in Patra, who she had developed feelings for. Following Paul's death, a trial ensued in which Linda was called to testify. Paul's parents recited their religious ideologies as the reason for not receiving medical attention, and although they were charged with manslaughter, they were both later acquitted on the grounds of religious exemption.

Linda never grew out of her emotionally distant ways. She struggled to create long-lasting relationships, changed her jobs repeatedly, and moved from town to town frequently. She continued to live in this way until she was 37 when her mother required her to move home to take care of her following Linda's father's death.

When Linda returned home, she was reminded of the eventful summer in which the aforementioned unfolded. The novel is concluded by the recount of another memory; her first day of 10th grade. As she believed that Lily had made up the accusations against Mr. Grierson, over the summer before grade 10 Linda wrote a letter to give to Lily pretending she was Mr. Grierson. This was with the hope to confront her classmate about her lies. However, she changed her mind after the summer break and did not give her the letter as she discovered that Lily was pregnant. Her pregnancy made Linda understand Lily's motivation of making up the accusations as it was so that she did not have to marry the boy who really impregnated her. Although Lily admitted to making up the accusations during Mr. Grierson's trial, the town still believed Lily's baby to be his. Linda tracked down Mr. Grierson through a website that kept records of sex offenders and contacted him through a letter. This letter denoted that she believed he was innocent. However, although he responded, this communication did not diminish Linda's desire for answers about Mr. Grierson and Lily's relationship.

== Characters ==
=== Main characters ===
- Madeleine Furston, "Mattie"/"Linda"– the 37-year-old protagonist recounting the events of the summer when she was fifteen. Due to lifelong isolation, Linda is an emotionally distant character who struggles to connect with people, constantly finding herself as an outsider. The novel follows her as she tries to interpret the disturbing events of her teen years and shows how these events continue to affect her as an adult.
- Lily Holburn - one of Linda's beautiful and popular classmates. Linda is fascinated with Lily, a fascination that is heightened after rumours start spreading of Lily's sexual encounter with Mr. Grierson, an accusation that Linda believes to be false.
- Paul Gardner– the four-year-old son of Linda's new neighbours who Linda babysits and quickly forms a unique bond with. Paul falls sick whilst Linda is babysitting him, and his health steadily declines until he dies. The trauma of Paul's death cements Linda's emotionally distant ways and affects her well into her adult life.
- Mr. Grierson – Linda's history teacher who Linda is also drawn to, but he appears to take a special interest in Lily. Linda learns that his former school fired him for accusations of paedophilia, and he is later fired by Linda's school as rumours spread that he had a sexual encounter with Lily. Although her town believes that he was the one that got Lily pregnant, Linda never thinks that this is the case.

=== Secondary Characters ===
- Linda's Mother – an overbearing maternal figure who Linda resents for misunderstanding her due to her doubting that she is her biological parent.
- Linda's Father – an emotionally distant parent, whose lack of relationship with Linda is one of the reasons that she struggles to make connections with people throughout her whole life.
- Leo Gardner– Paul's father who is a perpetually absent character. He is an enigmatic and controlling figure who believes in Christian Science and as a result does not believe in the practice of medicine, to the severe detriment of his son. After Paul's death, Leo and Paul's mother, Patra, are charged with manslaughter but acquitted on the grounds of religious exemption.
- Patra Gardner – Paul's young mother who hires Linda for the regular babysitting of Paul. She is also a Christian Scientist and was similarly charged and acquitted for manslaughter following her son's death.

== Major Themes ==
=== Belonging ===
Written from the perspective of an adolescent protagonist, the theme of belonging is explored as Linda attempts to find her place in the world whilst making sense of the uncomfortable realities of life. She is an outcast at school who struggles to connect with people, being scorned by her classmates and labelled as a “Freak” and a loner. She exists as a solitary observer with her social isolation being mirrored through her geographical isolation. Linda lives in an abandoned commune deep in rural Minnesota, surrounded only by lakes and forests. Once the Gardner family welcomes Linda into their home as a babysitter for Paul, she finds a sense of belonging. However, it is ultimately taken away from her after his death, leading to her ongoing search for belonging and intimacy which is seen in her sexual and romantic relationships as an adult.

=== The relationship between thought and action ===
As Linda's isolation hindered her ability to effectively communicate, she held the propensity to be an observer in other people's lives, often over involving herself. As a result, she held the responsibility of the onlooker. This is expressed in the sickness and eventual death of Paul where, even though she noticed Paul's health steadily declining, she failed to save his life. The theme is similarly conveyed through Linda's lack of action in Mr. Grierson's trial for the sexual assault of Lily, which she believed to be a lie. The theme is similarly conveyed in the sickness and eventual death of Paul where, even though she noticed Paul's health steadily declining, she failed to save his life.

=== Religion ===
The novel considers the ways in which people make sense of their lives and interpret death. Christian Science has a large influence in History of Wolves, with the structure of the novel being modelled after the teachings of the religion, as Linda chose to approach the world through both science and health. The novel explores the dangers of religion as Paul's death is a direct consequence of his parents' religious ideologies preventing them from seeking medical attention.

=== Emotional Trauma ===
One of the most notable themes in History of Wolves is emotional trauma and the role it plays on an individual as they grow and mature. Linda's mother, who she suspects is not her biological parent, and her emotionally distant father did not provide Linda with emotional attachment as an infant. Paul's death plagues Linda throughout the novel, well into her adult years. The trauma cemented Linda's emotionally distant ways and resulted in lifelong isolation. This is evident in her failure to maintain meaningful relationships and create a homelike environment.

== Structure ==
The novel is divided into two sections: “Science” and “Health”. The first section of the book aligns closely with Linda as a teenager, whilst the second section aligns more closely with Linda as an adult recounting her past. The first section focuses more on perception and observation, showing Linda as merely witnessing phenomena and actions, whilst the second section deals with the struggle of Linda's interpretation of these events. She attempts to connects the events of her youth to larger patterns of meaning, resulting in the understanding of causes and consequences.

The novel also follows two storylines: the one of Lily and Mr. Grierson, and the one of Paul.

== Critical reception ==
=== Accolades ===
When it was first published as a short story, History of Wolves won the McGinnis-Ritchie Award. Following the publication of the full novel in 2017, it was a finalist for the Man Booker Prize, the Midwest Booksellers Choice Awards, the Dublin IMPAC Prize, and the PEN/Robert W. Bingham Prize for Debut fiction. It won the Sue Kaufman Prize for First Fiction and was chosen as the Indie Next List Pick for #1 Great Read, The New York Times Editor's Choice, and was an Amazon Best Book of the Month. It was also featured in the USA Today's Notable Books, Barnes, and Noble Discover Great New Writers Selection, as well as was featured in the ABA Indies Introduce Selection.
