= Charles Bock =

American writer

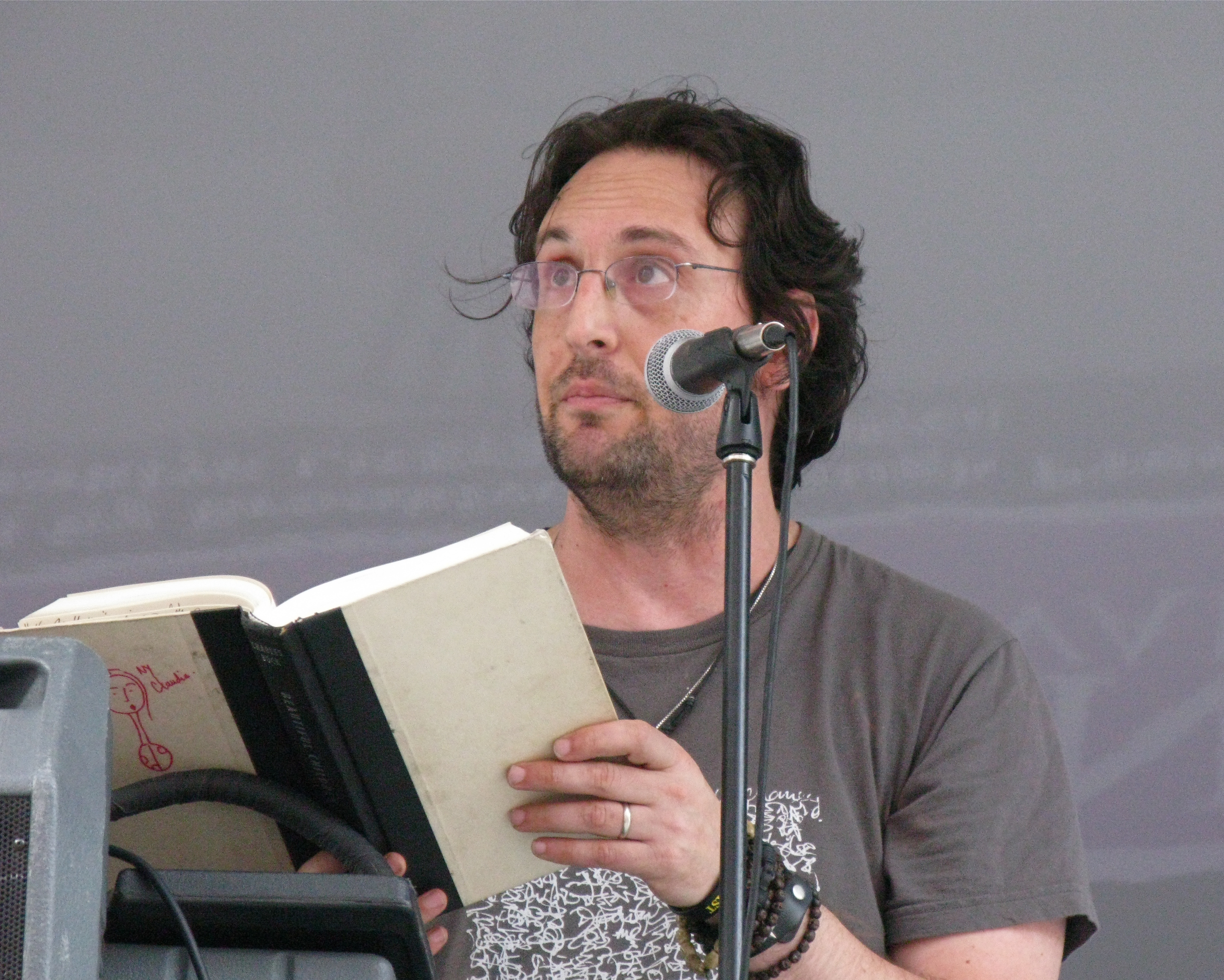
- Bock in 2008
- Born: 1969 (age 56–57); Las Vegas Valley, Nevada, U.S.
- Occupation: Novelist
- Writing career
- Genre: Contemporary fiction
- Website: www.charlesbock.net

Charles Bock (born 1969) is an American writer whose debut novel Beautiful Children (published by Random House) was selected by The New York Times as a Notable Book of the Year for 2008, and won the 2009 Sue Kaufman Prize for First Fiction from the American Academy of Arts and Letters. He lives in Brooklyn, New York.

== Biography ==
Bock was born and raised in Las Vegas, which served as the setting for Beautiful Children. He comes from a family of pawnbrokers who have operated shops in Downtown Las Vegas for more than 30 years. On his website, he reflects upon his upbringing as a source of inspiration for the novel:

Sometimes, when my siblings and I were little, my parents, for various reasons, used to have us stay in the back of the shop. This would be after school or during summer vacation, when there wasn’t summer camp, or they didn’t have anybody to watch over us and we were too small to be alone. We’d occupy our time with sodas from a nearby casino’s gift shop, comic books, and a television that got wavy reception, and we’d do small chores, rolling coins or filing the previous day’s pawn tickets. The store often had a line of people waiting to pawn their goods, local customers who worked in casinos and also spent all their spare time playing blackjack and slot machines, and also tourists who had blown all their cash, and maybe their plane tickets home, and now were desperate, and hung over, and needed loans on their wedding rings, so they could go back into the casinos and win back their money. I’d sometimes stare out of the back of the store and watch the people in line and take in their faces. Lots of times my parents would be put in the position of having to tell these people that their wedding ring was only worth a fraction of what they’d paid for it, or that, say, the diamonds in that ring were brown and flawed. From the back of the store, I’d watch as the customers exploded and called my parents dirty Jews and cursed at them and threatened them at the top of their lungs. It’s impossible in situations like that not to feel for everybody involved—to be horrified, sure, but more than that, to be saddened by the spectacle, to want so much more than that out of life for everyone.

Bock earned a Master's of Fine Arts in fiction and literature from Bennington College and has taught fiction at the Gotham Writers Workshop in New York City. He is a 2009 recipient of the Silver Pen Award (Nevada Writers Hall of Fame), which was established in 1996 to recognize mid-career writers who have already shown substantial achievement.

=== Personal life ===
In 2009, Bock's first wife, Diana Colbert, was diagnosed with leukemia. The couple's daughter, Lily Starr, was six months old at the time. Following a pair of bone marrow transplants, Diana Colbert died in December 2011, three days before Lily Starr's third birthday. He subsequently married writer Leslie Jamison, with whom he also has a daughter. They divorced in 2020 and share custody of their daughter.

== Beautiful Children ==
Bock's first novel Beautiful Children is about the interwoven lives of several characters in Las Vegas. The story focuses on the issue of homeless teenage runaways. Young Newell has A.D.D. and his overbearing mother Lorraine is not too keen on him hanging out with his older friend Kenny. The Girl With the Shaved Head is looking to fit in with some questionable characters that she just met on the Las Vegas Strip. Pony Boy has not always been the best boyfriend and lover to his stripper girlfriend Cheri. Comic book writer Bing Beiderbixxe is just in Vegas for the weekend. These characters' lives intersect in this unflinching tale about lost innocence.

== Alice & Oliver ==
Bock's second novel, Alice & Oliver, is based on his late wife Diana Joy Colbert and her illness. The novel follows a character battling cancer.
