= Emily Fridlund =

American novelist and academic

- Born: 1979-80 (age 47–48); Edina, Minnesota
- Occupations: Author, professor

Academic background
- Education: Principia College (B.A.); Washington University in St. Louis (MFA); University of Southern California (Ph.D)

Academic work
- Institutions: Cornell University
- Main interests: Creative writing, 20th-century and contemporary American and British literature, gender studies
- Writing career
- Notable work: History of Wolves
- Notable awards: Man Booker Prize (shortlist, 2017); PEN/Robert W. Bingham Prize; Sue Kaufman Prize for First Fiction; Mary McCarthy Prize
- Website: emilyfridlundbooks.com (archive version)

Emily Fridlund is an author and academic best known for her novel History of Wolves.

== Personal life ==
Fridlund grew up in Edina, Minnesota.

She has a bachelor's degree from Principia College in Illinois, an MFA in fiction from Washington University in St. Louis, and a Ph.D. in Literature and Creative Writing from the University of Southern California.

She currently lives in New York. She is married, and has one child.

== Career ==
Fridlund is an assistant professor at Cornell University in the Department of English.

Fridlund's debut novel, History of Wolves, was a finalist for the 2017 Man Booker Prize (one of six novels to be named to the shortlist) and the PEN/Robert W. Bingham Prize for Debut Fiction. In 2018, History of Wolves won the Sue Kaufman Prize for First Fiction.

Her 2017 collection of short stories, Catapult, won the Mary McCarthy Prize.

Her creative writing has appeared in many journals including New Orleans Review, Southwest Review, Boston Review and ZYZZYVA.

== Books ==
- History of Wolves (Grove Atlantic, 2017)
- Catapult (Sarabande, 2017)
