= Beautiful Children =

2008 novel by Charles Bock

- Beautiful Children cover
- Author: Charles Bock
- Language: English
- Genre: Psychological fiction
- Publisher: Random House
- Publication date: 2008
- Publication place: United States
- Media type: Print (Paperback) (Hardback)
- Pages: 432 pp
- ISBN: 978-0812977967
- OCLC: 82772602
- Dewey Decimal: 813/.6
- LC Class: 2007004166

Beautiful Children: A Novel is the first novel by author Charles Bock. The novel was awarded the Sue Kaufman Prize for First Fiction in 2009 and was selected as a 100 Notable Books of 2008 by The New York Times.

== Plot ==
Beautiful Children is about the interwoven lives of several characters in Las Vegas. The story focuses on the issue of homeless teenage runaways. Young Newell has ADD and his overbearing mother Lorraine is not too keen on him hanging out with his older friend Kenny. The Girl With the Shaved Head is looking to fit in with some questionable characters that she just met on the Las Vegas strip. Ponyboy has not always been the best boyfriend and lover to his stripper girlfriend Cheri. Comic book writer Bing Beiderbixxe is just in Vegas for the weekend. These characters' lives intersect in this unflinching tale about lost innocence.

== Characters ==
Newell Ewing - A 12-year-old boy who has been diagnosed with ADD. He lives in Las Vegas with his parents.
Lorraine Ewing - Newell's overbearing mother. She used to be a Vegas showgirl until she got a C-section scar from giving birth to Newell.
Lincoln Ewing - Newell's father. He had a chance at a promising career as a Major League baseball player until he suffered from an injury and then took a job in Las Vegas.
Kenny - Newell's friend who is older and has a car. Kenny is socially awkward. Kenny likes comic books.
The Girl with the Shaved Head - A young girl who is a loner. She is looking to make friends.
Lestat - A homeless teenage runaway. He tricks Newell and steals his cell phone.
Danger-Prone Daphney - A homeless anarchist Wiccan. She takes the girl with the shaved head under her wing.
Ponyboy - A rough gutter punk who runs packages around Las Vegas on his BMX bike. He lives at his girlfriend Cheri's house.
Jabba - Ponyboy's ruthless boss.
Cheri Blossoms - A Las Vegas stripper. She is very kind. She is Pony Boy's girlfriend.
Bing Beiderbixxe - A comic book creator who is socially awkward. He meets Cheri at a strip club.

== Resources for runaways ==
In the last pages of the 2008 hardcover edition there is a list of addresses, phone numbers and web sites that are listed as Resources. The author writes: "If you are out on the streets, or a parent of a missing teen, here are a few places to get help." These resources are for teenage runaways and their families.
