= Alexander Larman =

British author, journalist and historian

- Education: Regent's Park College, Oxford
- Occupations: Author, journalist, historian

Alexander Larman is a British author and journalist. His books are largely historical biographies. He has written for a range of British newspapers and magazines and is the books editor of The Spectator World.

== Education ==
Larman attended Winchester College and Regent's Park College, Oxford, where he read English.

== Career ==
Larman’s first book was published in 2014 entitled Blazing Star: The Life and Times of John Wilmot, 2nd Earl of Rochester, a biography of the Restoration poet and courtier. This was followed in 2016 by Restoration: 1666: A Year in Britain, a social history focusing on the events of 1666. That same year, Larman published Byron’s Women, a study of Lord Byron’s life through the perspectives of the women who knew him. The work was subsequently shortlisted for the Elma Dangerfield Prize.

Larman's next book published in 2020 was The Crown in Crisis: Countdown to the Abdication, which provides a detailed account of Edward VIII abdication crisis. The book drew international media attention due to Larman's discovery of new archival documents relating to an assassination attempt on the King by George McMahon.

Larman expanded his focus on the House of Windsor with two follow-up volumes: The Windsors at War: The Nazi Threat to the Crown (2023) and Power and Glory: Elizabeth II and the Rebirth of Royalty (2024). These works examine the Royal Family’s trajectory from the onset of World War II through the coronation of Elizabeth II. His writing in this series is noted for blending political history with personal narratives and utilizing previously unreleased archival materials.

Larman previously served as literary editor of The Chap magazine.

== Personal life ==
Larman's father-in-law was the Stirling Prize award-winning architect Will Alsop.

== Works ==
- Blazing Star: The Life and Times of John Wilmot, 2nd Earl of Rochester (Head of Zeus, 2014) ISBN 978-1781851098
- Restoration: 1666: A Year in Britain (Head of Zeus, 2016) ISBN 978-1781851333
- Byron's Women (Head of Zeus, 2016) ISBN 978-1784082024
- The Crown in Crisis: Countdown to the Abdication (Weidenfeld & Nicolson, 2020) ISBN 9781474612579
- The Windsors at War: The Nazi Threat to the Crown (Weidenfeld & Nicolson, 2023) ISBN 978-1474623933
- Power and Glory: Elizabeth II and the Rebirth of Royalty (Weidenfeld & Nicolson, 2024) ISBN 978-1399615525
- Lazarus: The Second Coming of David Bowie (New Modern, 2026) ISBN 978-1917923446
- The Secrets of Eaton Square: Sex, Scandal and Infamy on the Road to Buckingham Palace (St Martin's Press, 2026) ISBN 978-1250381255
- The Beckhams: A Royal Affair (Michael O'Mara Books, 2026) ISBN 978-1789299991
