= 2008 in literature =

This article contains information about the literary events and publications of 2008.

== Events ==
- January 1 – In the UK's 2008 New Year Honours List, Hanif Kureishi (CBE), Jenny Uglow (OBE), Peter Vansittart (OBE) and Debjani Chatterjee (MBE) are all rewarded for "services to literature".
- February 29 – Belgian-born "Misha Defonseca" admits that her bestselling Misha: A Mémoire of the Holocaust Years (1997) is a literary forgery.
- April – Signet Books announce they will cease to publish the American historical romance novelist Cassie Edwards after a dispute over plagiarism.
- April 25 – The first Twitter novel, Small Places by Nicholas Belardes, is launched.
- May 7–11 – The first Palestine Festival of Literature is held.
- June 15 – Gore Vidal, asked in a New York Times interview how he felt about the death of his rival William F. Buckley, Jr., replies: "I thought hell is bound to be a livelier place, as he joins forever those whom he served in life, applauding their prejudices and fanning their hatred."
- July – Salman Rushdie's Midnight's Children (1981) is the winner of a poll to select the "Best of the Booker".

== New books ==
=== Fiction ===
- Aravind Adiga
  - The White Tiger
  - Between the Assassinations (November 1)
- Uwem Akpan – Say You're One of Them
- Paul Auster – Man in the Dark
- Sebastian Barry – The Secret Scripture (September 29)
- Henry Bauchau – Le Boulevard périphérique
- John Berger – From A to X
- Charles Bock – Beautiful Children (January 22)
- Roberto Bolaño – 2666: A Novel (November 11)
- Christopher Buckley – Supreme Courtship (September 3)
- Alastair Campbell – All in the Mind (October 30)
- Martín Caparrós – A quien corresponda
- Eleanor Catton – The Rehearsal
- Wendy Coakley-Thompson – Triptych (December 18)
- Robert Crais – Chasing Darkness
- Debra Dean – Confessions of a Falling Woman
- Klaus Ebner – Hominid (October 1)
- Ralph Ellison (posthumous, ed. John F. Callahan) – Three Days Before the Shooting...
- Mathias Énard – Zone (August 15)
- Sebastian Faulks – Devil May Care (James Bond continuation novel)
- Keith Gessen – All the Sad Young Literary Men (April 10)
- Shanta Gokhale – Tyā varshī (Crowfall)
- Juan Goytisolo – Exiled from Almost Everywhere
- Paul Griffiths – let me tell you
- Lauren Groff – The Monsters of Templeton (February 5)
- Peter Handke – The Moravian Night (January 12, Germany)
- Johan Harstad – DARLAH
- Zoë Heller – The Believers (September 24)
- Aleksandar Hemon – The Lazarus Project (May 1)
- M. H. Herlong – The Great Wide Sea (October 2)
- Samantha Hunt – The Invention of Everything Else (February 7)
- Siri Hustvedt – The Sorrows of an American (April 1)
- Karl Iagnemma – The Expeditions (January 15)
- Robert Juan-Cantavella – El Dorado
- Jack Kerouac and William S. Burroughs (posthumous) – And the Hippos Were Boiled in Their Tanks (November 1; written 1945)
- Philip Kerr – A Quiet Flame
- Christian Kracht – Ich werde hier sein im Sonnenschein und im Schatten (September)
- László Krasznahorkai – Seiobo There Below
- Jhumpa Lahiri – Unaccustomed Earth (April 1)
- Kelly Link – Pretty Monsters (October 2)
- David Lodge – Deaf Sentence (May 1)
- James McBride – Song Yet Sung (February 5)
- Joe McGinniss Jr. – The Delivery Man (January 15)
- Ronit Matalon – The Sound of Our Steps (Kol Tsa'adenu)
- Lydia Millet – How the Dead Dream (January 25)
- Toni Morrison – A Mercy (November 11)
- Nunoe Mura – GeGeGe no Nyōbō (ゲゲゲの女房)
- Joyce Carol Oates – My Sister, My Love (June 24)
- Sofi Oksanen – Puhdistus
- Chuck Palahniuk – Snuff (May 20)
- Arturo Perez-Reverte – The Painter of Battles (January 8)
- Jodi Picoult – Change of Heart (March 4)
- José Luis Rodríguez Pittí – Sueños urbanos
- Richard Price – Lush Life (March 4)
- Ruth Rendell – Portobello (November 20)
- Nina Revoyr – The Age of Dreaming
- Nathaniel Rich – The Mayor's Tongue (April 8)
- Marilynne Robinson – Home (September 2)
- Charlotte Roche – Feuchtgebiete (February 25)
- Mary Ann Rodman – Jimmy's Stars
- Philip Roth – Indignation (September 16)
- Salman Rushdie – The Enchantress of Florence (June 3)
- Tiziano Scarpa - Stabat Mater
- Will Self – The Butt
- Curtis Sittenfeld – American Wife (September 2)
- Sjón – Rökkurbýsnir
- Elizabeth Strout – Olive Kitteridge (March 25)
- Tom Rob Smith – Child 44
- Joan Thomas – Reading by Lightning
- David Turashvili – Flight from the USSR
- John Updike – The Widows of Eastwick (October 28)
- Tobias Wolff – Our Story Begins (March 25)

=== Genre fiction ===
- Jim Butcher – Small Favor (April 1) (Harry Dresden #10)
- Matthew J. Costello – Doom 3: Worlds on Fire (February 26)
- Ursula K. Le Guin – Lavinia
- Stephen King – Duma Key (January 22)
- Patricia A. McKillip – The Bell at Sealey Head (September 2)
- Stephenie Meyer – Breaking Dawn (August 2)
- Douglas Preston – Blasphemy (January 8)
- Matthew Stover – Caine Black Knife (October 14)
- Brent Weeks – The Way of Shadows

=== Children and young people ===
- David Almond
  - The Savage
  - Jackdaw Summer
- Dave Barry and Ridley Pearson – Science Fair
- Nick Bland – The Very Cranky Bear
- Eoin Colfer – Artemis Fowl: The Time Paradox (July 15)
- Frank Cottrell-Boyce – Desirable
- Suzanne Collins – The Hunger Games (September 14)
- John Fardell – Manfred the Baddie
- Mem Fox – Ten Little Fingers and Ten Little Toes
- Cornelia Funke – Inkdeath (October 7)
- John Green – Paper Towns (October 16)
- Brian Greene – Icarus At The Edge Of Time
- Charlie Higson – Young Bond: By Royal Command (September 3)
- Minoru Kawakami and Satoyasu – Horizon on the Middle of Nowhere
- Gordon Korman – Swindle
- D. J. MacHale – Raven Rise (May 20)
- Patricia Martin - Lulu Atlantis and the Quest for True Blue Love (January 8)
- Jenny Nimmo – Charlie Bone and the Shadow of Badlock (June 1)
- Garth Nix – Superior Saturday (May 5)
- Arielle North Olson – More Bones: Scary Stories From Around The World
- Christopher Paolini – Brisingr (September 2)
- Ridley Pearson - Steel Trapp: The Challenge
- Amjed Qamar – Beneath My Mother's Feet
- Rick Riordan – The Maze of Bones
- Angie Sage – Queste (April 8)
- Michael Salzhauer – My Beautiful Mommy

=== Drama ===
- Salvatore Antonio – In Gabriel's Kitchen
- Howard Brenton – Never So Good
- Mary Higgins Clark – Where Are You Now?
- Paul Dwyer – The Bougainville Photoplay Project
- Nicholas de Jongh – Plague Over England
- Johan Heldenbergh and Mieke Dobbels – The Broken Circle Breakdown featuring the cover-ups of Alabama
- Ella Hickson – Eight
- Sam Holcroft – Cockroach
- Elaine Murphy – Little Gem
- Lynn Nottage – Ruined
- Tyler Perry – The Marriage Counselor
- Taavi Vartia – Kaikkien aikojen Pertsa ja Kilu

=== Non-fiction ===
- The Academi – Encyclopaedia of Wales (Gwyddoniadur Cymru) (January)
- Julie Andrews – Home: A Memoir of My Early Years (April 1)
- Kwame Anthony Appiah – Experiments in Ethics
- Dan Ariely – Predictably Irrational (February 19)
- Margaret Atwood – Payback: Debt and the Shadow Side of Wealth (October 1)
- Mary Beard – Pompeii: The Life of a Roman Town
- Dionne Brand – A Kind of Perfect Speech (Ralph Gustafson Lecture)
- Augusten Burroughs – A Wolf at the Table (April 29)
- Michael Chabon – Maps and Legends (May 1)
- D. K. Chakrabarti – The Battle for Ancient India: An essay in the sociopolitics of Indian archaeology
- Rob Christensen – The Paradox of Tar Heel Politics
- Sloane Crosley – I Was Told There'd Be Cake (April 1)
- John Duignan – The Complex: An Insider Exposes the Covert World of the Church of Scientology (October 7)
- Eminem – The Way I Am (October 21)
- Richard Florida – Who's Your City? (March)
- Raymond Geuss – Philosophy and Real Politics
- Philip Hoare – Leviathan, or The Whale (September 16)
- Jim Holt – Stop Me If You've Heard This: A History and Philosophy of Jokes
- Chloe Hooper – The Tall Man: Death and Life on Palm Island
- B. B. Lal – Rāma, His Historicity, Mandir, and Setu: Evidence of Literature, Archaeology, and Other Sciences
- Thomas Cairns Livingstone – Tommy's War: A First World War Diary 1913–1918
- Minae Mizumura – The Fall of Language in the Age of English
- Scholastique Mukasonga – La femme aux pieds nus (The Barefoot Woman)
- Haruki Murakami (translated by Philip Gabriel) – What I Talk About When I Talk About Running (July 29)
- Shuja Nawaz – Crossed Swords: Pakistan, Its Army, and the Wars Within
- Frances Osborne – The Bolter: Idina Sackville
- Chris Pash – The Last Whale
- Randy Pausch and Jeffrey Zaslow – Last Lecture
- Peter Rees – The Other ANZACs
- David Sedaris – When You Are Engulfed in Flames (June 3)
- Tore Skeie – Alv Erlingsson: fortellingen om en adelsmanns undergang
- Vaclav Smil – Energy in Nature and Society: General Energetics of Complex Systems
- Chunghee Sarah Soh – The Comfort Women: Sexual Violence and Postcolonial Memory in Korea and Japan
- Shreve Stockton - The Daily Coyote
- Jane Straus – The Blue Book of Grammar and Punctuation
- Kate Summerscale – The Suspicions of Mr. Whicher, or The Murder at Road Hill House (April)
- Ronnie Thompson (pseudonym) – Screwed: The Truth About Life as a Prison Officer (January 24)
- Bjørn Christian Tørrissen – One for the Road (January 31; translation of I pose og sekk!, 2005)
- Barbara Walters – Audition: A Memoir (May 6)
- Russell Wangersky – Burning Down the House: Fighting Fires and Losing Myself
- Meralda Warren and others – Mi Base side orn Pitcairn (My Favourite Place on Pitcairn, first book published in Pitkern creole)
- Dagmar S. Wodtko, Britta Irslinger and Carolin Schneider (eds.) – Nomina im Indogermanischen Lexikon

== Deaths ==
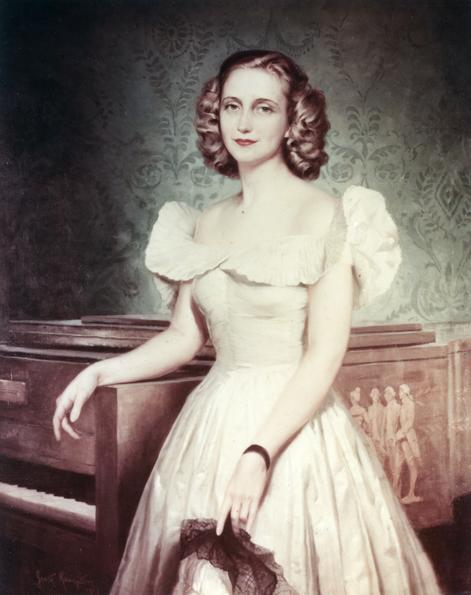
Margaret Truman

- January 2 – George MacDonald Fraser, Scottish novelist and screenplay writer (born 1925)
- January 3 – Henri Chopin, French poet (born 1922)
- January 11 – Nancy Phelan, Australian writer (born 1913)
- January 13 – Patricia Verdugo, Chilean journalist and writer (born 1947)
- January 16 – Hone Tuwhare, New Zealand poet (born 1922)
- January 17 – Edward D. Hoch, American detective fiction writer (born 1930)
- January 26
  - John Ardagh, Nyasaland-born English journalist and writer (born 1928)
  - Abraham Brumberg, American writer and editor (born 1926)
- January 29 – Margaret Truman, American crime novelist and singer (born 1924)
- January 30 – Miles Kington, Northern Irish-born English journalist and writer (born 1941)

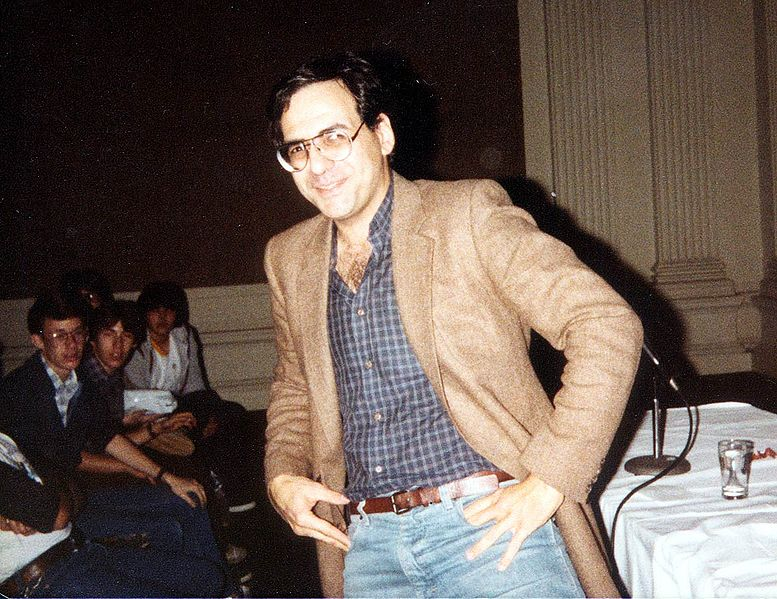
Steve Gerber

- February 4 – Rose Hacker, English writer and journalist (born 1906)
- February 7 – Richard Altick, American literary historian (born 1915)
- February 8 – Phyllis A. Whitney, Japan-born American mystery writer (born 1903)
- February 10 – Steve Gerber, American comic book writer (born 1947)
- February 18 – Alain Robbe-Grillet, French novelist (born 1922)
- February 21
  - Archie Hind, Scottish novelist (born 1928)
  - Robin Moore, American novelist and memoirist (born 1925)
- February 22 – Stephen Marlowe, American science fiction and crime writer (born 1928)
- February 28 – Julian Rathbone, English novelist (born 1935)
- February 29 – Val Plumwood (Val Routley), Australian philosopher (born 1939)

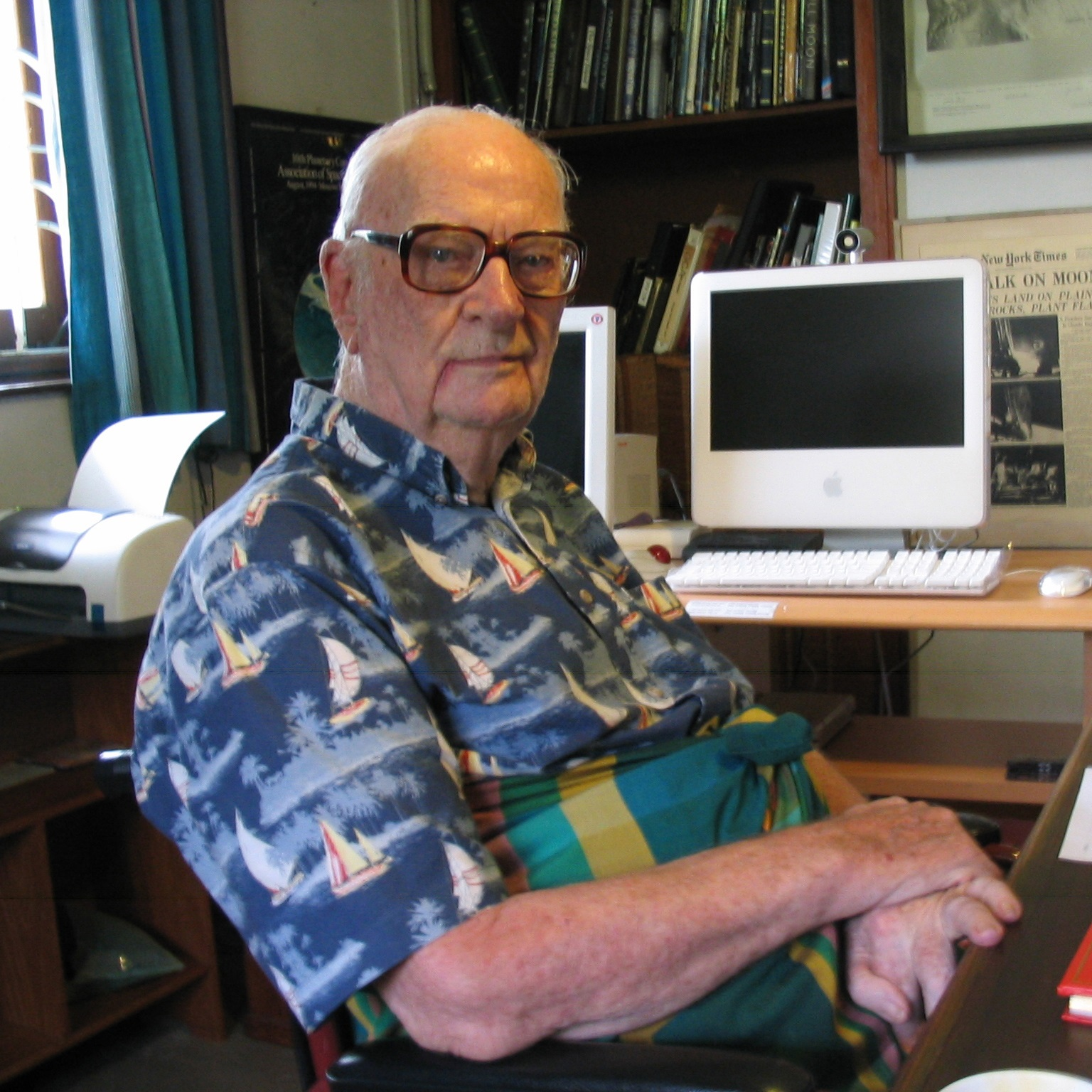
Arthur C. Clarke

- March 16 – Jonathan Williams, American poet (born 1929)
- March 19
  - Arthur C. Clarke, English science fiction writer and futurologist (born 1917)
  - Hugo Claus, Belgian writer in Flemish and English (born 1929)
- March 23 – E. A. Markham, Montserrat poet, writer and activist (born 1939)
- April 3 – Andrew Crozier, English poet and scholar (born 1943)
- April 7 – Ludu Daw Amar, Burmese writer and journalist (born 1915)
- April 13 – Robert Greacen, Irish poet (born 1920)
- April 17
  - Aimé Césaire, Martinique poet and writer in French (born 1913)
  - Zoya Krakhmalnikova, Russian writer and editor (born 1929)
- April 18
  - Michael de Larrabeiti, English young-adult novelist and travel writer (born 1934)
  - William W. Warner, American biologist and Pulitzer Prize writer (born 1920)
- May 1 – Elaine Dundy, American novelist, biographer and playwright (born 1921)
- May 9 – Nuala O'Faolain, Irish critic and writer (born 1940)
- May 11 – Jeff Torrington, Scottish novelist (born 1935)
- May 12 – Oakley Hall, American novelist (born 1920)
- May 14 – Roy Heath, Guyanese novelist (born 1926)
- May 15 – Muhyi al-Din Faris, Sudanese poet (born 1936)
- May 19 – Vijay Tendulkar, Indian playwright (born 1928)
- May 22 – Robert Asprin, American science fiction writer (born 1946)
- May 23 – Alan Brien, English journalist and novelist (born 1925)
- May 28 – Elinor Lyon, British children's writer (born 1921)

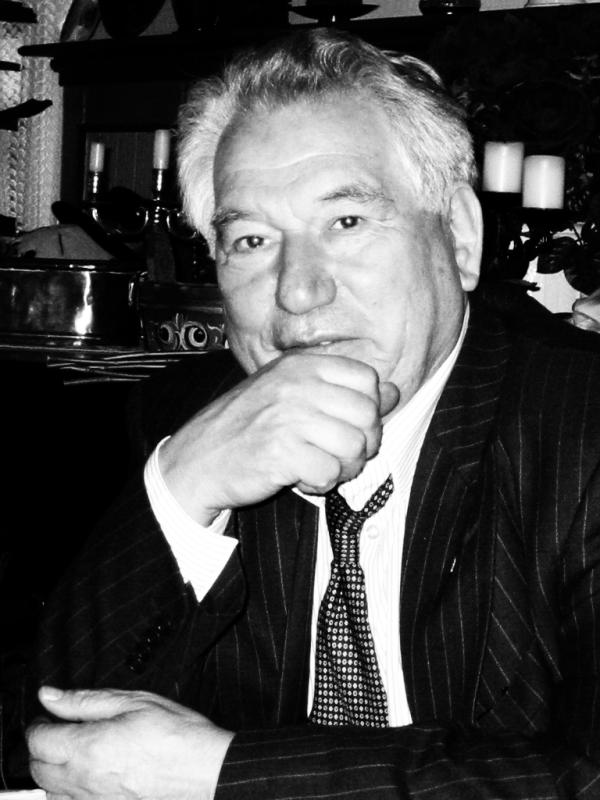
Chinghiz Aitmatov

- June 2 – Ferenc Fejtő, Hungarian-born French historian and journalist (born 1909)
- June 4 – Matthew Bruccoli, American biographer and scholar (born 1931)
- June 5 – Angus Calder, British writer and scholar (born 1942)
- June 8 – Peter Rühmkorf, German poet and writer (born 1929)
- June 9 – Algis Budrys (John A. Sentry), American science fiction writer of Lithuanian origin (born 1931)
- June 10
  - Chinghiz Aitmatov, Kyrgyz writer in Kyrgyz and Russian (born 1928)
  - Eliot Asinof, American novelist and baseball writer (born 1919)
- June 16 – Mario Rigoni Stern, Italian novelist (born 1921)
- June 18 – Tasha Tudor, American children's writer and illustrator (born 1915)
- June 22 – Albert Cossery, Egyptian-born French novelist (born 1913)
- June 24 – Ruth Cardoso, Brazilian anthropologist and writer (born 1930)
- June 25 – Lyall Watson, South African scientist and new age writer (born 1939)
- June 27 – Lenka Reinerová, Czech writer in German (born 1916)

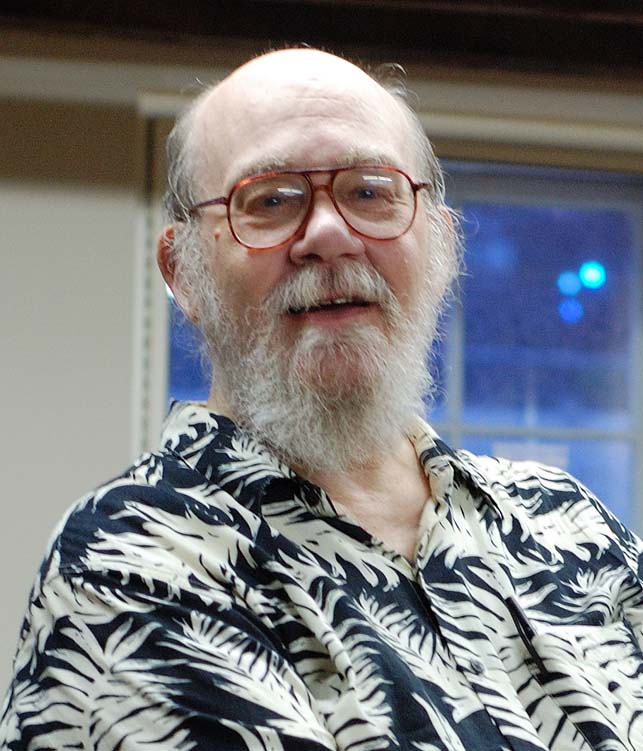
Thomas M. Disch

- July 1
  - Clay Felker, American magazine editor and journalist (born 1925)
  - Robert Harling, English typographer and novelist (born 1910)
- July 2 – Simone Ortega, Spanish cookery writer (born 1919)
- July 4
  - Thomas M. Disch, American science fiction author and poet. (born 1940)
  - Janwillem van de Wetering, Dutch novelist and writer in Dutch and English (born 1931)
- July 20 – Roger Wolcott Hall, American memoirist and novelist (born 1919)
- July 27 – Bob Crampsey, Scottish writer (born 1930)
- July 30 – Peter Coke, English playwright (born 1913)

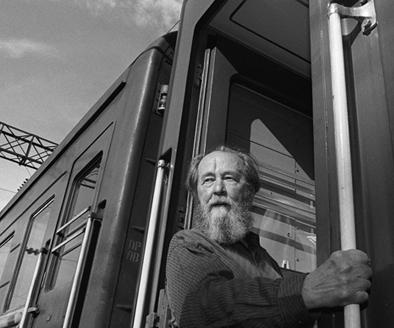
Aleksandr Solzhenitsyn

- August 3 – Aleksandr Solzhenitsyn, Russian writer and Nobel laureate (born 1918)
- August 7 – Simon Gray, English playwright and memoirist (born 1936)
- August 9 – Mahmoud Darwish, Palestinian poet (born 1942)
- August 11 – George Furth, American playwright (born 1932)
- August 17 – Dave Freeman, American writer and advertising executive (born 1961)
- August 23 – John Russell, English art critic (born 1919)
- August 25 – Ahmed Faraz (Syed Akhmad Shah), Pakistani poet in Urdu (born 1931)
- August 31 – Ken Campbell, English novelist and playwright (born 1941)

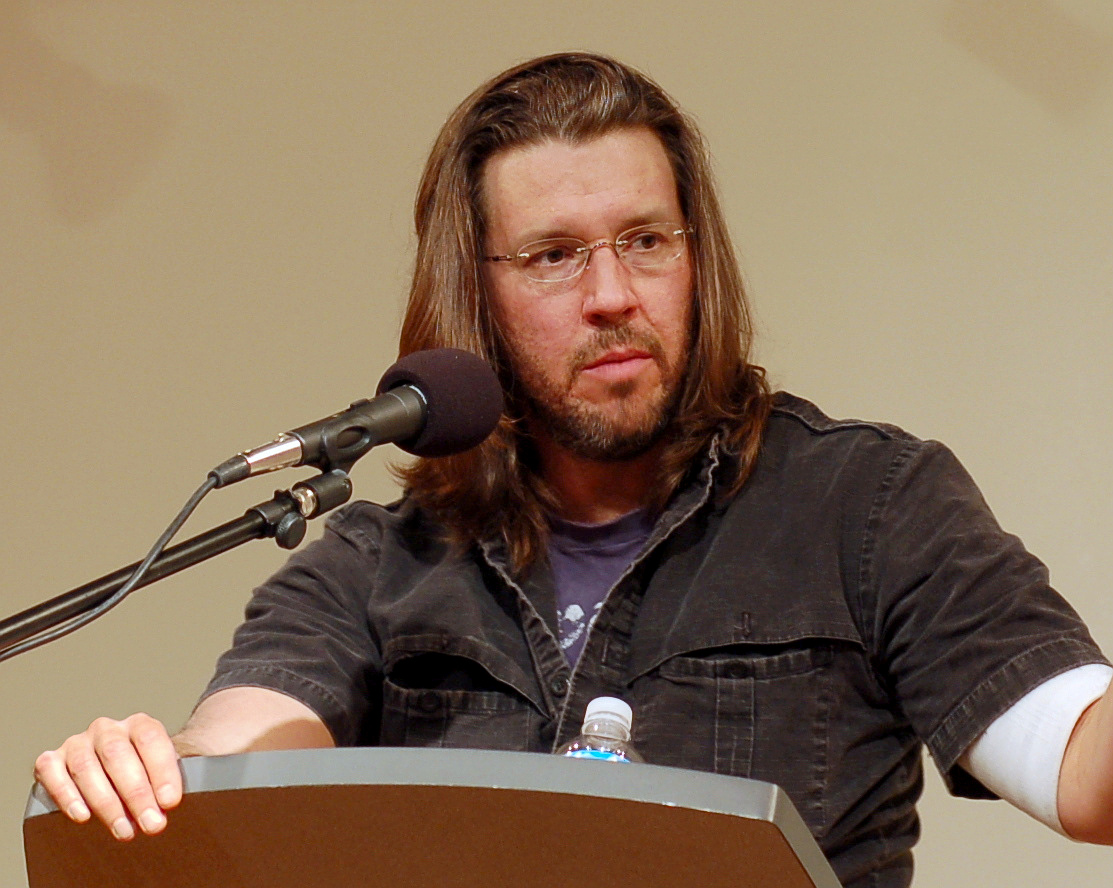
David Foster Wallace

- September 5 – Robert Giroux, American editor and publisher (born 1914)
- September 7 – Gregory Mcdonald, American mystery writer (born 1937)
- September 12 – David Foster Wallace, American novelist (born 1962)
- September 17 – James Crumley, American crime writer (born 1939)
- September 20 – Duncan Glen, Scottish poet, critic and literary historian (born 1933)
- September 23 – William Woodruff, English historian and autobiographer (born 1916)
- September 24 – Bengt Anderberg, Swedish poet, novelist and children's writer (born 1920)
- September 29 – Hayden Carruth, American poet and literary critic (born 1921)
- October 4 – Peter Vansittart, English novelist and historical writer (born 1920)
- October 10 – Ilie Purcaru, Romanian journalist and poet (born 1933)
- October 14 – Barrington J. Bayley, English science fiction writer (born 1937)
- October 26 – Tony Hillerman, American mystery writer (born 1925)
- October 27 – Es'kia Mphahlele, South African writer in English (born 1919)
- October 29 – William Wharton (Albert William Du Aime), American novelist (born 1925)
- October 31 – Studs Terkel, American historian and broadcaster (born 1912)
- November 4 – Michael Crichton, American writer and scholar (born 1942)
- November 13 – Jules Archer, American historian and author (born 1915)
- November 14 – Kristin Hunter, American author and academic (born 1931)
- December 1 – Dorothy Sterling, American non-fiction writer for children and historian (born 1913)
- December 4 – Forrest J Ackerman, American magazine editor, science fiction writer, and literary agent (born 1916)
- December 15 – Anne-Catharina Vestly, Norwegian children's book author (born 1920)
- December 20 – Adrian Mitchell, English poet, playwright and fiction writer (born 1932)
- December 24 – Harold Pinter, English playwright and screenwriter (born 1930)
- December 31 – Donald E. Westlake, American novelist (born 1933)

== Awards and honors ==
- Camões Prize: João Ubaldo Ribeiro
- Europe Theatre Prize: Patrice Chéreau
- European Book Prize: Tony Judt, Postwar
- International Dublin Literary Award: Rawi Hage, De Niro's Game
- International Prize for Arabic Fiction: Bahaa Taher, Sunset Oasis
- Nobel Prize in Literature: J. M. G. Le Clézio

=== Australia ===
- Miles Franklin Award: Steven Carroll, The Time We Have Taken

=== Canada ===
- Canada Reads: Paul Quarrington, King Leary
- Dayne Ogilvie Prize: Main award, Zoe Whittall; honours of distinction, Brian Francis, John Miller.
- Edna Staebler Award for Creative Non-Fiction: Bruce Serafin, Stardust
- Governor General's Awards: Multiple categories; see 2008 Governor General's Awards.
- Hilary Weston Writers' Trust Prize for Nonfiction: Taras Grescoe, Bottomfeeder: How to Eat Ethically in a World of Vanishing Seafood
- Rogers Writers' Trust Fiction Prize: Miriam Toews, The Flying Troutmans
- Scotiabank Giller Prize: Joseph Boyden, Through Black Spruce
- Writers' Trust Engel/Findley Award: Michael Winter

=== Sweden ===
- Astrid Lindgren Memorial Award: Sonya Hartnett

=== United Kingdom ===
- Bookseller/Diagram Prize for Oddest Title of the Year: The 2009-2014 World Outlook for 60-milligram Containers of Fromage Frais, Philip M. Parker
- Caine Prize for African Writing: Henrietta Rose-Innes, "Poison"
- Carnegie Medal for children's literature: Philip Reeve, Here Lies Arthur
- Man Booker Prize: Aravind Adiga, The White Tiger
- Orange Broadband Prize for Fiction: to The Road Home by Rose Tremain

=== United States ===
- Lambda Literary Awards: Multiple categories; see 2008 Lambda Literary Awards.
- National Book Award for Fiction: to Shadow Country by Peter Matthiessen
- National Book Critics Circle Award: to 2666 by Roberto Bolaño
- Newbery Medal for children's literature: Laura Amy Schlitz, Good Masters! Sweet Ladies! Voices from a Medieval Village
- PEN/Faulkner Award for Fiction: Kate Christensen, The Great Man
- Pulitzer Prize for Fiction: Junot Diaz, The Brief and Wondrous Life of Oscar Wao
- Whiting Awards:

Fiction: Mischa Berlinski, Laleh Khadivi, Manuel Muñoz, Benjamin Percy, Lysley Tenorio
Nonfiction: Donovan Hohn
Plays: Dael Orlandersmith
Poetry: Rick Hilles, Douglas Kearney, Julie Sheehan

=== Other ===
- Friedenspreis des Deutschen Buchhandels: Anselm Kiefer
- Premio de la Crítica de Galicia (category Ensayo y Pensamiento): Xurxo Borrazás, Arte e parte

== Notes ==
- Hahn, Daniel (2015). The Oxford Companion to Children's Literature (2nd ed.). Oxford. University Press. ISBN 9780198715542.

== See also ==
- List of literary awards
- List of poetry awards
- 2008 in comics
- 2008 in Australian literature
