= Three for the Road =

Three for the Road may refer to:

- Three for the Road (1987 film), a road comedy film
- Three for the Road (TV series), a 1975 American drama television series
- Three for the Road (2007 film), a Japanese film
- Three for the Road, a 2018 album by John Mayall
- Three for the Road, a 1989 album by Spike Robinson

== See also ==
- One for the Road (disambiguation)
- Two for the Road (disambiguation)
