= Altick =

Altick is a surname. Notable people with the surname include:

- Frances Altick (born 1994), American tennis player
- Richard Altick (1915–2008), American literary scholar
