= Brumberg =

Brumberg is a surname. Notable people with the surname include:

- The Brumberg sisters, pair of Soviet animation directors
- Abraham Brumberg, American writer and editor
- Joan Jacobs Brumberg, American social historian
- Ryan Brumberg, Republican nominee for New York's 14th congressional district in the 2010 U.S. House of Representatives elections
- Victor Brumberg, Russian theoretical physicist

== See also ==
- 4916 Brumberg, minor planet
