= A Quien Corresponda =

A Quien Corresponda (Spanish for "To Whom It May concern") may refer to:

- A quien corresponda, an Argentine novel, written by Martín Caparrós
- A Quien Corresponda, a Mexican TV show funded by Fundación Azteca
- A Quien Corresponda, a Mexican magazine
