= J. Richard Cohen =

American civil rights lawyer

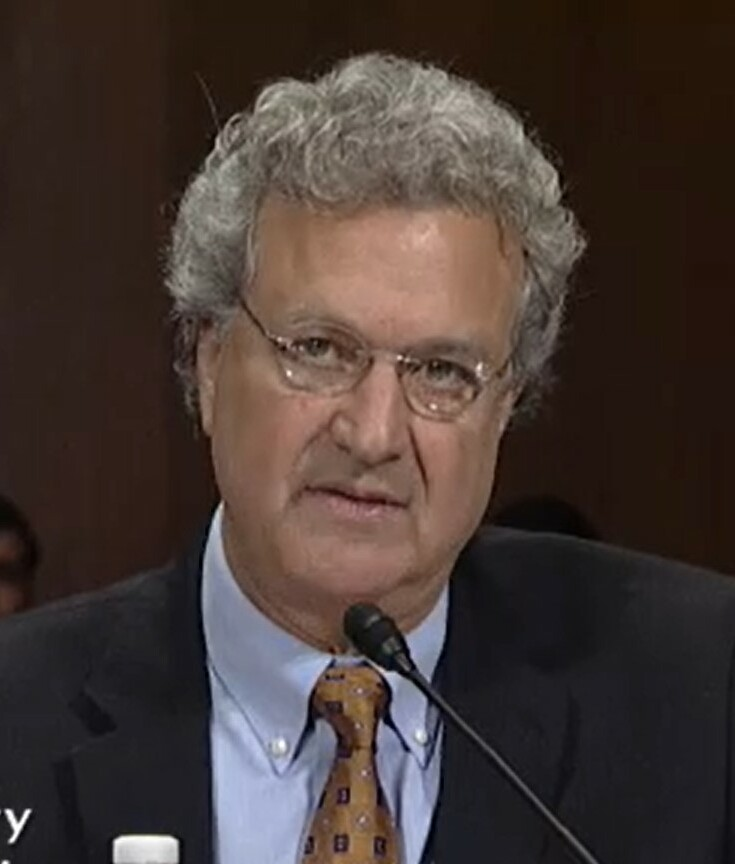
- Cohen in 2017
- Born: Richmond, Virginia, U.S.
- Education: Columbia University (BA); University of Virginia (JD)
- Occupation: Civil rights lawyer
- Known for: Former president of the Southern Poverty Law Center

J. Richard Cohen is an American attorney who was the president and chief executive officer of the Southern Poverty Law Center from 1986 to 2019.

== Biography ==
Cohen was born and raised in Richmond, Virginia to a Jewish family. His father ran an interior decorating firm and his mother was a legal secretary. When crosstown busing came to Richmond, he persuaded his parents to let him attend a public school as opposed to a private school, and Cohen left high school one year early to attend Columbia University. He graduated from Columbia University in 1976 and the University of Virginia School of Law in 1979. He studied under Raymond Geuss and Arthur Danto at Columbia.

Cohen's upbringing in the South influenced his trajectory as a civil rights lawyer. After law school, Cohen practiced law in Washington, D.C., with Charles Morgan Jr. for seven years. In 1986, at the urging of Morris Dees, he moved to Montgomery, Alabama and became the legal director of the SPLC. Two months after he joined SPLC, he was asked to defend a case in front of the Supreme Court of the United States, in which the Justice Department wanted the court to reverse a lower court order requiring Alabama state troopers to promote one black trooper for each white trooper promoted.

As general counsel, Cohen subsequently litigated against various white supremacist groups as well as lawsuits defending civil rights. In 1997, Cohen was named by The American Lawyer as one of 45 public sector lawyers "whose vision and commitment are changing lives." He was also a finalist for the national Trial Lawyer of the Year Award for his work on the Macedonia Baptist Church arson lawsuit.

In 2003 he became president of the SPLC. Cohen stepped down in 2019 with the ousting of Dees.
