= Why Does the World Exist? =

Book by Jim Holt

- Hardcover edition
- Author: Jim Holt
- Language: English
- Subject: Philosophy and cosmology
- Genre: Non-fiction
- Publisher: W. W. Norton & Company
- Publication date: 16 July 2012
- Publication place: United States
- Media type: Print, e-book
- Pages: 300+
- Awards: New York Times bestsellers, National Book Critics Award finalist
- ISBN: 978-0871404091
- OCLC: 793973660
- Dewey Decimal: 113
- LC Class: BD511 .H65 2012 and QB980-991
- Preceded by: Stop Me If You've Heard This
- Followed by: When Einstein Walked With Gödel

Why Does the World Exist?: An Existential Detective Story is a nonfiction work authored by Jim Holt. He and the book were on the LA Times bestseller list during the last quarter of 2012, and the first quarter of 2013. The book was also a 2012 National Book Critics Award finalist for nonfiction.

== Central theme ==
A central question of the book is, "Why is there something rather than nothing?", which lies in the domain between philosophy and scientific cosmology.

Gottfried Wilhelm Leibniz, in 1714, was the first to publish the question.

In this book, the author records a quest to answer the question through a series of interviews and discussions. Some of the persons interviewed are John Updike, David Deutsch, Adolf Grünbaum, John Leslie, Derek Parfit, Roger Penrose, Richard Swinburne, Steven Weinberg, and Andrei Linde.

Along the way, Jim Holt also introduces the reader to the philosophy of mathematics, theology, physics, ontology, epistemology, and other subjects.

== Review ==
In “Why Does the World Exist?,” Jim Holt, an elegant and witty writer comfortably at home in the problem’s weird interzone between philosophy and scientific cosmology, sets out in search of such answers. He takes inspiration from readings of Heidegger and Sartre, and from something Martin Amis once said in a television interview: “We’re at least five Einsteins away from answering that question.”... Holt reminds us that no exploration of being — especially human being — can be separated from the human who undertakes it, complete with character and the play of moods. Updike felt that the universe had “a color, a quiet but tireless goodness that things at rest, like a brick wall or a small stone, seem to affirm.” Surely this was a mood, even a quirk of biochemistry, but it opens a perspective on the universe, too. The question of being itself, as Updike and Holt agree, can seem profound in one mood, vacuous in another.

—The New York Times
