= Raymond Geuss =

American philosopher

Raymond Geuss FBA
- Born: December 10, 1946 (age 79); Evansville, Indiana, U.S.

Education
- Education: Columbia University (BA, PhD)
- Thesis: Persons and Selves (1971)
- Doctoral advisor: Robert Denoon Cumming

Philosophical work
- Era: Contemporary philosophy
- Region: Western philosophy
- School: Continental philosophy; Critical theory
- Institutions: Princeton University; Columbia University; University of Chicago; Heidelberg University; University of Freiburg; University of Cambridge
- Doctoral students: Michael N. Forster; Lawrence Hamilton; Katherine Harloe; Cornel West
- Main interests: Ethics; Political philosophy; Philosophy of history; Intellectual history

Raymond Geuss (/ɡɔɪs/; born 1946) is an American political philosopher and scholar of 19th and 20th century European philosophy. He is a professor emeritus in the Faculty of Philosophy, University of Cambridge. Geuss is primarily known for his early account of ideology critique in The Idea of a Critical Theory (1981); his works instrumental to the emergence of political realism in Anglophone political philosophy, including Philosophy and Real Politics; and his essays on topics including aesthetics, Nietzsche, contextualism, phenomenology, intellectual history, and ancient philosophy.

== Life ==
Geuss was educated at Columbia University, receiving a B.A. in 1966 and a Ph.D. in 1971. His Ph.D. thesis was written under the direction of Robert Denoon Cumming. Geuss also worked with Sidney Morgenbesser and Robert Paul Wolff during this time.

Geuss taught at Princeton University, Columbia University, and the University of Chicago in the United States, and at Heidelberg University and the University of Freiburg in Germany before taking up a lecturing post at the University of Cambridge in 1993. In 2000 he became a naturalised British citizen. He was elected a Fellow of the British Academy in 2011.

Geuss has supervised the graduate work of several prominent scholars of philosophy. His students also include lawyer J. Richard Cohen, filmmaker Ethan Coen, and philosopher Cornel West.

== Work ==
Geuss has published 16 books of philosophy, including Philosophy and Real Politics (2008), A World Without Why (2014), and Not Thinking Like a Liberal (2022). He has co-edited two critical editions of works of Friedrich Nietzsche, The Birth of Tragedy and Writings from the Early Notebooks. Geuss has also published two collections of translation-adaptations of poetry from Ancient Greek, Latin and Old High German texts.

== Reception ==
Alasdair MacIntyre writes about Geuss:

No one among contemporary moral and political philosophers writes better essays than Raymond Geuss. His prose is crisp, elegant, and lucid. His arguments are to the point. And, by inviting us to reconsider what we have hitherto taken for granted, he puts in question not just this or that particular philosophical thesis, but some of the larger projects in which we are engaged. Often enough Geuss does this with remarkable economy, provoking us into first making his questions our own and then discovering how difficult it is to answer them.

== Books ==
- The Idea of a Critical Theory. Cambridge University Press. 1981. ISBN 978-0521284226.
- Morality, Culture, and History. Cambridge University Press. 1999. ISBN 978-0521632027.
- Parrots, Poets, Philosophers, & Good Advice. London: Hearing Eye. 1999. ISBN 978-1870841634.
- History and Illusion in Politics. Cambridge University Press. 2001. ISBN 978-0521805964.
- Public Goods, Private Goods. Princeton University Press. 2001. ISBN 978-0691089034.
- Glück und Politik [Happiness and Politics]. Berliner Wissenschafts-Verlag. 2004. ISBN 978-3830509448.
- Outside Ethics. Princeton University Press. 2005. ISBN 978-0691123417.
- Philosophy and Real Politics. Princeton University Press. 2008. ISBN 978-0691137889.
- Politics and the Imagination. Princeton University Press. 2010. ISBN 978-0691155883.
- A World Without Why. Princeton University Press. 2014. ISBN 978-0691155883.
- Reality and its Dreams. Cambridge, Massachusetts: Harvard University Press. 2016. ISBN 978-0674504950.
- Changing the Subject: Philosophy from Socrates to Adorno. Cambridge, Massachusetts: Harvard University Press. 2017. ISBN 978-0674545724.
- Who Needs a World View?. Cambridge, Massachusetts: Harvard University Press. 2020. ISBN 978-0674245938.
- A Philosopher Looks at Work. Cambridge University Press. 2021. ISBN 978-1108930611.
- Not Thinking Like a Liberal. Cambridge, Massachusetts: Belknap Press. 2022. ISBN 978-0674270343.
- Seeing Double. Cambridge: Polity. 2024. ISBN 978-1509560882.
- Tracks in Chaos: Philosophical Orientation and Political Reflection. Cambridge: Polity. 2026. ISBN 978-1509573448.
