= The Ending Chronicle =

Japanese light novel series

- Cover of the first light novel volume, featuring Sadagiri Shinjou

終わりのクロニクル (Owari no Chronicle)
- Genre: Action, Adventure, Fantasy, Science fiction, Romance
- Light novel
- Written by: Minoru Kawakami
- Illustrated by: Satoyasu
- Published by: ASCII Media Works
- Imprint: Dengeki Bunko
- Magazine: Dengeki Bunko Magazine
- Original run: June 10, 2003 – December 10, 2005
- Volumes: 14

The Ending Chronicle (終わりのクロニクル, Owari no Chronicle; lit. "Chronicle of the End") is a light novel series written by Minoru Kawakami (川上 稔) and illustrated by Satoyasu (さとやす). It has 14 volumes published from June 2003 to December 2005 by Dengeki Bunko. It takes place in the past of Horizon in the Middle of Nowhere, another of Kawakami's light novel series. The series takes place in the second era of a six-stage universe, with Kawakami's other works (including Horizon in the Middle of Nowhere) encompassing the other five.

== Plot ==
1945 – The end of World War II. It was a year that would be forever engraved in human history, but it was also the year when another war that does not have a special place in the pages of history ended. Those who knew of it named it the Concept War (概念戦争, Gainen Sensou).

Sixty years later, in 2005 after the death of his grandfather, the high school student Mikoto Sayama, vice-president of the Taka-Akita Academy's Student Council, is suddenly summoned by the giant corporation IAI. There, he is informed of the existence of the UCAT institution and his grandfather's deep involvement with it and the Concept War. His grandfather and UCAT fought against ten alternate worlds called Gears (G/ギア, Gia) that existed separate to this one. These worlds were not parallel, they existed in multiple phases atop each other like a planetary orbit. They could approach each other and interact and affect each other on a set cycle. When this fact was discovered, they began an all-out war among themselves to destroy each other. With the world at stake, his grandfather took part in this war in order to destroy other worlds. Sixty years ago, Sayama's grandfather and his comrades destroyed all the Gears from the 1st to the 10th and in the end, only this world, the world known as Low-Gear, survived.

Carrying on his back, the phrase "the surname Sayama indicates a villain" and all the hatred, Mikoto Sayama begins the last negotiation with the other Gears' survivors, the Leviathan Road (全竜交渉 (レヴァイアサンロード), Revuaiasan Rōdo), in order to save Low-Gear from a new crisis. What is the crisis that approaches Low-Gear, this world in which the survivors of the other worlds live? And what is the meaning of the Leviathan Road which was left to Sayama Mikoto in order to avoid that crisis? Can this world truly reach a conclusion that will not bring its own end despite having ended so many other worlds? When Sayama Mikoto faces the emotions of those who were once defeated, what answer will he give?

== Characters ==
=== Team Leviathan ===
Mikoto Sayama (佐山・御言, Sayama Mikoto)
Voiced by: Daisuke Hirakawa (drama CD)
The main protagonist. Taka-Akita Academy's Student Council vice-president. Second Year. Team Leviathan representative, negotiator and leader. Always accompanied by Baku. Georgius' user. Currently without any relatives, the Tamiya household take care of him. He was trained by Hiba Ryuutetsu at the Hiba Dojo, so he is quite proficient at martial arts.

By the will of his deceased grandfather Kaoru Sayama, he was designated as the representative of Low-Gear in the negotiations. His grandfather was one of the Eight Dragon Kings (八大竜王, Hachi Dai Ryūō) who destroyed the other worlds. Despite being his grandson, Mikoto's father was adopted so he was not really blood related to his grandfather. As the successor of the villain Kaoru Sayama, he was entrusted with the negotiations that will shape the destiny of the world itself, the Leviathan Road.

He has been raised from childhood to be a superb villain, in other words, to perform necessary evils. However, all his grandfather had taught him was how to do it, not when. As Sayama doesn't know when the abilities he carries are truly necessary, he has grown to never be really serious about anything, at least until he finds about what happened sixty years ago and meets Shinjou, the one who will be his counterbalance.

Sayama has a quite unique and self-centered personality, and even after meeting Shinjou, to whom he shows romantic interest from very early, he does not put the brake to his own eccentricities. As he puts it, "I'm Sayama Mikoto, the negotiator of the Leviathan Road and the person at the center of the world." He likes to wear suits, so when not wearing the school uniform he usually wear a three-piece suit. During fighting, he uses his UCAT anti-Gear combat uniform made up of a white body suit and thick, black tights with white shorts and a coat worn over that. Also he always wears a women's ring on the middle finger of his left hand.

Despite being an active part in the struggles and negotiations surrounding the Leviathan Road, he has a physical and mental handicap that is triggered under certain occasions. Because of his past experiences (like when his mother apparently attempted a shared suicide with him) every time he remembers his family he suffers from symptoms similar to an angina, causing severe pain that sometimes even forces him to his knees. As the story progresses and he gradually discovers the involvement of his parents with UCAT, Sayama has to face that condition. Also, in his second year of middle school, he advanced to the openweight finals for student karate but he lost after breaking his fist, so he still feels some phantom pain while clenching it.

Sadagiri Shinjou (新庄・運切, Shinjou Sadagiri)
Voiced by: Rie Kugimiya (drama CD)
The heroine. Taka-Akita Academy's Student Council secretary. Second Year. In charge of Team Leviathan's vanguard protection. Ex-St user. Having grown up in the mountains of Okutama her common sense is behind about 10 or 20 years.

Mysterious girl assigned to the Team Leviathan. Receives preferential treatment in UCAT Japan and those who know her true story are very few, like Ooshiro Kazuo. She has lost her memory, so she does not remember where she came from or her own parents, so she joins the Leviathan Road to find information about her past. However, the clues are very scarce as besides her name, she only has a men's ring in her right hand's middle finger and the memory of the Silent Night song.

Her body changes sex from day to night. During the day she is a boy named Setsu and during the night she is a girl named Sadame.

As a gunner, she uses the Cowling Staff Ex-St as her personal weapon, but during combat often hesitates whether to shoot or not the enemy. At Shinjou's request, Ex-St's attack power is proportional to the strength of her intentions, so it would not create more destruction than the user wished. But even with such a function, Shinjou feels a great sense of rejection when she presses the trigger. Opposites in nature, Sayama finds in her sweetness the justice he does not have, so they quickly get fond of each other and she becomes his counterbalance.

The truth of her past seems to be directly connected to the Concept War to the point she is referred by the holy sword Gram as "the key that binds it all together" and the end to the history that began 60 years ago. The story advances as she tries to discover the truth of her parents alongside Sayama.

It's eventually revealed Shinjou is a human from the Top-Gear. Her mother was from the Low-Gear and she married her own male counterpart from the Top-Gear. This is the cause for Shinjou's unstable sex.

Kaku Izumo (出雲・覚, Izumo Kaku)
Voiced by: Kishō Taniyama (drama CD)
Taka-Akita Academy's Student Council president. Third Year, but actually twenty years old. Team Leviathan vanguard force along with his partner Kazami Chisato, who is also his girlfriend. V-Sw's user. Son of the current president of IAI and a 10th-Gear mother, so he is a Low-Gear and 10th-Gear mixed race that has inherited divine protection from his mother, making his body extremely resilient. An irresponsible and cheerful individual.

He lives with Chisato in one of the Academy's dorms since the presidential election, and even if they are not married yet is as if they were already. They met two years ago during an incident that involved 6th-Gear and 10th-Gear. He is always lasciviously joking around with Chisato, and she hits him all the time due to it.

In combat, he easily wields V-Sw, an unconventional enormous Cowling Sword that differs from other more common Concept Weapons in that it has 6th-Gear Concept Core sealed inside and powering its abilities. V-Sw has a will on its own, recognizes Kaku as its owner and its power is based in the concept of "destruction and rebirth" making it one of the most powerful weapons that the Japanese UCAT has at their disposition.

Like most of the other Team Leviathan members, his grandfather Zen Izumo was one of the Eight Dragon Kings, specifically the one in charge of 6th-Gear and 10th-Gear destruction. Both his grandmother and his mother were former inhabitants of 10th-Gear, and 10th-Gear blood flows strongly within him. Until two years ago, when he met Chisato, he lived in a 10th-Gear settlement in the Kinki region and he even had a different name and used a different language. After a battle caused by the remnants of 6th-Gear where both him and Chisato became involved, both joined Japanese UCAT and their destinies mixed together.

Chisato Kazami (風見・千里, Kazami Chisato)
Voiced by: Ai Maeda (drama CD)
Taka-Akita Academy's Student Council treasurer. Third Year. Team Leviathan vanguard force along with her boyfriend Kaku Izumo. G-Sp2 and X-Wi user. Originally she was a Low-Gear ordinary person, but after the Leviathan Road with 6th-Gear and 10th-Gear two years before the story began she became a member of the Japanese UCAT. Her father is a TV Program Planner and her mother was a popular singer and she also performs in a school band. A bright but violent and impulsive girl.

She lives with Kaku in the Academy's dorms and even if they are not married yet they already have a de facto marital relationship accepted by her parents. Unlike the other Team Leviathan members, her family had not any relationship with the Concept War or the other Gears in the past, so she lived an ordinary life until she met Kaku in an incident two years before, when she became accidentally involved in a fight against 6th-Gear. Both Kaku and her survived and ended as Team Leviathan first members.

Her main weapon is G-Sp2, a Cowling Lance that holds inside 10th-Gear’s Concept Core. This is a "divine lance" with a will on its own that recognizes Chisato as its owner. She also uses the Concept Equipment X-Wi, producing yellow wings of light who lets her to leapt high into the sky and fly across the battlefield, giving her high mobility. From ensure air superiority to assault the position of the main enemy force, she has a wide range of roles in the battlefield and is one of the Team Leviathan main assets. Because of the blessing of G-Sp2 she also has a superhuman strength, but Kaku is able to withstand her blows thanks to the defense granted by his maternal blood.

Within a Team Leviathan full of eccentric individuals, she is one of the most grounded in common sense and at times also coordinates the group's efforts. While cheerful and lively, once she experiences failure she is prone to have a hard time getting back on her feet.

Ryuuji Hiba (飛場・竜司, Hiba Ryuuji)
Taka-Akita Academy's Student Council accounting assistant. First Year. Team Leviathan force against Gods of War along with Mikage and Susamikado. He is a boy who became involved with Sayama during the Leviathan Road with 3rd-Gear. Hiba is excellent in melee combat and weapons against one-on-one guidance. He is the grandson of Ryuutetsu Hiba, the bearer of the power that destroyed 3rd-Gear.
He has repeatedly fought 3rd-Gear to aim Mikage from before the Leviathan Road, and during the Leviathan Road with 3rd-Gear, he faces the whole Leviathan Team.
Initially, he was trying to liquidate the impurity of 3rd-Gear by himself, but after Izumo and Sayama defeat him and reprimand him about how he is making Mikage worried about him, he changes his mind and decides to cooperate.

Mikage Hiba (飛場・美影, Hiba Mikage)
Team Leviathan force against Gods of War along with Ryuuji Hiba and Susamikado. Mikage is the daughter of the king of 3rd-Gear Zeus and Rhea. Before her birth, Zeus planned to duplicate Mikage with clone technology to increase the number of people in 3rd-Gear, for which Mikage's mother betrayed 3rd-Gear and fled to Low-Gear. Shortly after Mikage's birth, she was abducted by Zeus and Apollo and since her body would grow into one that could not bear children, she was transferred into the body of an automaton that would evolve into a human able to have children. She was left in the care of the Hiba family by Ryuuji's father shortly before he died ten years before the start of the series.
For some reason, Mikage's evolution stopped five years prior the start of the series. Ryuuji suspected the cause was that Mikage only had half of the 3rd-Gear Concept Core, which is why he wanted to take the other half from Typhon. However, the real reason for Mikage's stuck was her fear of evolving into a human being, but she once she overcomes her fears she continues to gradually evolve into human.
She has the ability to summon Susamikado.

Dan Harakawa (ダン・原川, Dan Harakawa)
Voiced by: Hiroshi Okamoto (drama CD)
Taka-Akita Academy's Student Council vice-president assistant. Second Year. Team Leviathan force against mechanical dragons. Responsible for the piloting of Thunder Fellow.
He is a Japanese-American boy. His real name is Dan Northwind, but he took his mother's surname because he hates his father.
He has a habit to call others by their full name. He has a part-time job at the Yokota Air Base.
He becomes involved in the Leviathan Road after he helps Heo escape from the mechanical dragon Black Sun.

Heo Thunderson (ヒオ・サンダーソン, Hio Sandāson)
Middle school student. Team Leviathan force against mechanical dragons. Responsible for maneuvering auxiliary and limiter control of Thunder Fellow.
A girl who came to Japan with her adoptive great-grandfather Richard Thunderson to cooperate in the Leviathan Road with 5th-Gear. Shortly after arriving to Japan, she and her great-grandfather are attacked by the mechanical dragon Black Sun. Heo manages to run away, but her great-grandfather stays behind and is killed by Black Sun. She meets Harakawa during her fled. She guards the Thunder Fellow, the last mechanical dragon made from a human of 5th-Gear which was entrusted to her by her great-grandfather.
Her name means Happiness in 5th-Gear's language.

=== Japanese UCAT ===
Kazuo Ooshiro (大城・一夫, Ooshiro Kazuo)
Voiced by: Eiji Maruyama (drama CD)
The head of Japanese UCAT.
Old man of the round glasses. In the past, he seems to have been a rigorous and ruthless person who performed the annihilation warfare, but now he doesn't show even glimpse.
His hobby is collecting erotic figures and photos of beautiful women.

Itaru Ooshiro (大城・至, Ooshiro Itaru)
Voiced by: Kazuya Nakai (drama CD)
The son of Kazuo and the supervisor of Team Leviathan. A skinny elderly man with an iron cane. He is the only person that remains from the old Japanese UCAT and knows a lot of secrets. He suffers from an incurable disease caused by a negative concept.

Sf
Voiced by: Yui Kano (drama CD)
Itaru's personal maid. An automaton created by German UCAT using 3rd-Gear technology. Her name is an abbreviation of the German word "Sein Frau (the woman who should exist)". She doesn't have emotions, except that relating to protecting her master, and a hate for the Soviet Union. She keeps heavy weapons under her skirt using gravity control and she takes them out immediately at the time required.

Reel Ooki (リール・大樹, Rīru Ooki)
English teacher and student council's adviser at the Takaakita Academy. Homeroom teacher of the class of Sayama and Shinjou. She is a tree spirit from 10th-Gear in charge of the detection and analysis of Concept Spaces for Team Leviathan.

Sibyl (シビュレ, Shibyure)
In charge of communications and equipment management for Team Leviathan. An automaton prototype of Mikage. She acts as a mother and sister figure to Mikage, the only partner with whom she can share a common memory.

Sei Chao (趙・晴, Chō Sei)
The medical chief of Japanese UCAT. In the past, she belonged to Chinese UCAT and was the Eight Great Dragon Kings member in charge of 7th-Gear.

=== German UCAT ===
Diana Zonburg (ディアナ・ゾーンブルク, Diana Zōnburuku)
A member of German UCAT and Siegfried's niece who was sent to Japan as European UCAT's inspector for Team Leviathan. She is also Germany’s greatest witch who was once known as the Mother Cat and is the only surviving member of the Five Great Peaks. She was the teacher of Heo Thunderson and is the wife of Colonel Odor from American UCAT.

=== American UCAT ===
Colonel Odor (オドー, Odō)
The inspector of American UCAT. After Richard Thunderson's death, he comes to Japan to protect Heo Thunderson and demand Japanese UCAT to pass the rights of the Leviathan Road to them. He is the husband of Diana Zonburg. His real name is Richard Davis. His main attack is a fingersnap that can create a force that can crush his opponents to the ground from above.

Roger Sully (ロジャー・シュリー, Rojā Shurī)
The assistant inspector of American UCAT. A former member of the Japanese UCAT, he is an acquaintance of Oshiro Itaru, Ziana Zonburg and Harakawa Yui. One of the few individuals who knows the hidden truth about the Great Kansai Earthquake and Top-Gear. He can use dream sand to make other people sleep and manipulate their dreams.

== Media ==
=== Light novels ===
The Ending Chronicle began as serial light novel series run in Dengeki Bunko Magazine in 2003. When it finished on December 10, 2005, it had 14 compilation volumes covering seven separate arcs published by ASCII Media Works' imprint Dengeki Bunko. By 2008, it was #44 in the overall ranking from 1979 to 2008 of top-selling light novels by series with 1,300,000 estimated copies sold.

=== Drama CD ===
A drama CD was released after the main series ended, on March 31, 2006.

=== Music ===
A series of music albums were released by Voltage of Imagination and Tenky, named GET SET - TEAM LEVIATHAN CHRONICLE (released on August 25, 2008), AHEAD - TEAM LEVIATHAN CHRONICLE (released on November 5, 2008), BREAK - TEAM LEVIATHAN CHRONICLE (released on April 28, 2009) and GO AHEAD - TEAM LEVIATHAN CHRONICLE (released on August 14, 2009).

== Reception ==
The Ending Chronicle ranked two times in the top ten of the Takarajimasha's annual light novel guide book Kono Light Novel ga Sugoi!, a list of the most popular light novels and their characters according to their readers: fifth in 2006 and seventh in 2007. Between the 2005 and 2007 issues of Kono Light Novel ga Sugoi!, main character Mikoto Sayama ranked three times, third place in 2005, second place in 2006 and finally he was the No. 1 ranked male light novel character in the 2007 issue.
