= When Einstein Walked with Gödel =

2018 book by Jim Holt

When Einstein Walked With Gödel: Excursions to the Edge of Thought
- Hardcover edition
- Author: Jim Holt
- Language: English
- Subject: Philosophy of science
- Genre: Non-fiction
- Publisher: Farrar, Straus and Giroux
- Publication date: 15 May 2018
- Publication place: United States
- Media type: Print, e-book
- Pages: 384 pages
- ISBN: 978-0374146702
- Preceded by: Why Does the World Exist?

When Einstein Walked With Gödel: Excursions to the Edge of Thought is the third nonfiction book authored by American philosopher and essayist Jim Holt. The book was initially released by Farrar, Straus and Giroux on 15 May 2018.

== Background ==
The book is a collection of Holt's previous 25 essays on such diverse themes as science, philosophy, the nature of time, eugenics, quantum physics, string theory, relativity, the future of the universe, and the foundation of mathematics. Holt also explores the works of such scientists as Alan Turing, Benoit Mandelbrot, Emmy Noether, and others.

== Reception ==
Parul Sehgal of The New York Times stated: "In these pieces, plucked from the last 20 years, Holt takes on infinity and the infinitesimal, the illusion of time, the birth of eugenics, the so-called new atheism, smartphones and distraction. It is an elegant history of recent ideas. There are a few historical correctives — he dismantles the notion that Ada Lovelace, the daughter of Lord Byron, was the first computer programmer. But he generally prefers to perch in the middle of a muddle — say, the string theory wars — and hear evidence from both sides without rushing to adjudication. The essays orbit around three chief concerns: How do we conceive of the world (metaphysics), how do we know what we know (epistemology) and how do we conduct ourselves (ethics)".

Steven Poole of The Wall Street Journal commented: "...this collection of previously published essays by Jim Holt, who is one of the very best modern science writers".
