= Muhyi al-Din Faris =

Sudanese poet (1936-2008)

- محي الدين فارس
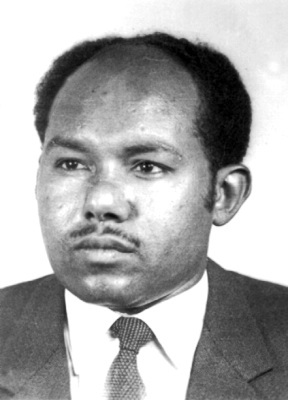
- Muhyi al-Din Faris, 1970s
- Born: 1936; Argo Island, Dongola, Anglo-Egyptian Sudan
- Died: May 15, 2008 (aged 72); Omdurman, Republic of the Sudan
- Education: University of Cairo
- Occupations: Poet, teacher
- Writing career
- Language: Arabic
- Years active: 1950s-2008

Muhyi al-Din Faris (Arabic: محي الدين فارس, romanized: Muḥyī al-Dīn Fāris; 1936 – 15 May 2008) was a Sudanese poet. He first emerged in the 1950s and was considered one of the most prominent poets of the Sudanese Free Poetry School, which was an influential movement of Sudanese poetry in Egypt that also includes Muhammad al-Fayturi, Gely Abdel Rahman, and Taj El-Sir El-Hassan. Faris was born on Argo Island in Dongola, Sudan; grew up in Alexandria, Egypt; and went to university in Cairo. Faris worked in Sudan as a schoolteacher, lecturer, and educational inspector until his retirement in 1992. He died at the age of 72 and left behind several poetry collections.

== Biography ==
His nasab (patronymic name) is Muhyi al-Din bin Faris bin Ahmad bin Abd al-Mawla. He was born in 1936 in Argo Island, a historical town in Dongola, Northern Sudan, which at the time was part of Anglo-Egyptian Sudan. Faris lived in Egypt as a child and completed his primary, intermediate, and secondary studies in Alexandria; and attended both Cairo University and Al-Azhar University. Faris worked in the educational sector as a teacher for the Sudanese Ministry of Education, a lecturer at University of Bakhtalruda, and as an educational inspector in Wad Madani until his retirement in 1992.

Faris died on 15 May 2008 in Omdurman, Sudan.

== Poetry ==
Muhyi al-Din Faris first emerged as a poet in the 1950s; he published his poetry in newspapers and magazines, and was considered one of the most-prominent poets of the Sudanese Free Poetry School, which he formed with Muhammad al-Fayturi, Gely Abdel Rahman, and Taj El-Sir El-Hassan. The organization intended to create an influential literary movement in Egypt.

Faris's style focuses on the concurrence of free verse and traditional poetry, and later shifted from symbolism to realism poetry. He alternated both styles, and added to his work's symbolism by adding more depth and vivid experiences. His poetry has several trends, the most prominent of which is its symbolic style. His collection The Clay and the Nails (Arabic: الطين و الاظافر) was published in 1956 with an introduction by critic Mahmoud Amin Al-Alam, who stated: "The poet transcends the eloquence of the singular word and phrase to the eloquence of a general context of the literary work; The rhetoric of building and deep-rooted structuring, internal relations between social content and artistic formulation."

Faris published more collections of poetry, including Nuqūsh ʿalá wajh al-mafāzah (Arabic: نقوش علی وجه المفازة) (1978), The Broken Lantern (Arabic: القنديل المکسور) (1997) and Tasābīḥ ʻāshiqah (Arabic: تسابيح عاشقة) (2000). The poems from these and other collections were published in Sudanese and Arab newspapers and magazines. His works were circulated especially by Gulf publications such as the Kuwaiti Al-Arabi and the Saudi Al-Faisal.

== Works ==
Poetry collections:

- Arabic: الطين والأظافر, 1956
- Arabic: نقوش علی وجه المفازة, romanized: Nuqūsh ʻalʹa wajh al-mafāzah, 1978
- Arabic: صهيل النهر, 1989
- Arabic: القنديل المكسور, romanized: al-Qindīl al-maksūr, 1997
- Arabic: تسابيح عاشق, romanized: Tasābīḥ ʻāshiq, 2000
- Arabic: أفريقيا لنا, romanized: Afrīqīyā lanā, 2005
