= One for the Road =

One for the Road may refer to:

== Literature ==
- "One for the Road" (short story), a short story by Stephen King
- One for the Road (Bjørn Christian Tørrissen book), a travel book
- One for the Road (Pinter play)
- One for the Road (Russell play)
- One for the Road, a book by Tony Horwitz
- One for the Road, a mystery novel by Fredric Brown

== Music ==
=== Albums ===
- One for the Road (April Wine album)
- One for the Road (Devin The Dude album)
- One for the Road (The Kinks album)
- One for the Road (Ocean Colour Scene album)
- One for the Road (Ronnie Lane album)
- One for the Road (Willie Nelson and Leon Russell album)
- One for the Road (Buckwheat Zydeco album)
- One for the Road, an album by Culann's Hounds
- One for the Road, an album by Ray Stevens

=== Songs ===
- "One for the Road" (song), a song by Arctic Monkeys
- "One for the Road", a song by House of Pain
- "One for the Road", a song by Judas Priest
- "One for the Road", a song by Ocean Colour Scene
- "One for the Road", a song by Bob Dylan
- "One for the Road", a song in the video game Guitar Hero II by the Breaking Wheel

== Film and television ==
- One for the Road (2003 film), a British comedy-drama film
- One for the Road (2009 film) (Le dernier pour la route), a French film
- One for the Road (2014 film), a Mexican film
- One for the Road (2021 film), a Thai drama film
- Blue Collar Comedy Tour: One for the Road, a 2006 television film and CD album
- Glenn Tilbrook: One for the Road, a 2004 documentary
- One for the Road, a British television series starring Alan Davies

=== Television episodes ===
- "One for the Road" (Alfred Hitchcock Presents)
- "One for the Road" (Amazing Stories)
- "One for the Road" (All Saints, season 3)
- "One for the Road" (All Saints, season 9)
- "One for the Road" (The Bill)
- "One for the Road" (Blue Heelers)
- "One for the Road" (Cheers)
- "One for the Road" (Chelmsford 123)
- "One for the Road" (ER)
- "One for the Road" (Gunsmoke)
- "One for the Road" (Harry O)
- "One for the Road" (Hey Dad..!)
- "One for the Road" (Iznogoud)
- "One for the Road" (Just Deal)
- "One for the Road" (Major Dad)
- "One for the Road" (Man About the House)
- "One for the Road" (Party of Five)
- "One for the Road" (Roseanne)
- "One for the Road" (Safe Harbor)
- "One for the Road" (Starman)
- "One for the Road" (Surfside 6)
- "One for the Road" (Whatever Happened to the Likely Lads?)
- "One for the Road" (Within These Walls)
- "One for the Road" (Yu-Gi-Oh!)
- "One for the Road", an episode of Target: The Corruptors!
- "One for the Road", an episode of The Web
- "One for the Road", an episode of The Grand Tour

== See also ==
- "One for My Baby (and One More for the Road)", a song written by Harold Arlen and Johnny Mercer, popularized by Frank Sinatra
- One More for the Road (disambiguation)
- One More from the Road, an album by Lynyrd Skynyrd
- Two for the Road
