= Lawrence Hamilton =

Political scientist

Lawrence Hamilton (born 1972) is a political theorist and the SA-UK Bilateral Research Chair in Political Theory at the University of the Witwatersrand, and the University of Cambridge, which he has held since March 2016. He became a full professor at the age of 36 and he has been a full professor of political studies at the University of the Witwatersrand since 2014. Before that he was a full professor at the University of Johannesburg, and senior lecturer and associate professor at the University of KwaZulu-Natal. He is the only political scientist to receive an A-rating from the South African National Research Foundation (NRF).

Hamilton contributes to rethinking political theory from the perspective of the global South. His research interests include topics in contemporary political theory such as states, power, representation, freedom, needs, rights, resistance, democracy, markets, development and political judgment. These are all informed by real world politics — particularly in the global South — as well as the history of political thought, South African politics, political economy and global intellectual history.

== Academic career ==
Hamilton received his PhD from Cambridge University in 2001, where his thesis "The Significance of Need: A Political Conception" was supervised by Raymond Geuss and Amartya Sen. It was nominated for the Sir Ernest Barker Prize for best UK dissertation in political theory. Following his PhD, he went on to be the Mellon Junior Research Fellow at Clare Hall, Cambridge.

Hamilton is an elected member of the Academy of Science of South Africa (ASSAf) and is editor-in-chief of Theoria: A Journal of Social and Political Theory. He is the co-founder and co-director of the African Political Theory Association (APTA), which was set up in 2017 to develop and facilitate the exchange of ideas in political theory on the continent. One of APTA's main outreach functions is the APTA Political Theory Summer School.

== Publications and selected works ==
Hamilton has published, co-authored and edited seven books. He has more than 30 journal publications and 12 peer-reviewed book chapters. These include:

- How To Read Amartya Sen (Delhi: Penguin Random House, 2020)
- Amartya Sen (Cambridge: Polity Press, 2019)
- Freedom is Power: Liberty Through Political Representation (Cambridge: Cambridge University Press, 2014)
- Are South Africans Free? (London: Bloomsbury, 2014)
- Intellectual Traditions in South Africa: Ideas, Institutions and Individuals (Scottsville: University of KwaZulu-Natal Press, 2014)
- Puzzles in contemporary political philosophy: An introduction to South African students(Pretoria: van Schaik Publishers, 2012)
- The Political Philosophy of Needs (Cambridge: Cambridge University Press, 2003)

His single-authored books published between 2014 and 2020 have been reviewed very positively over 30 times in leading journals such as Perspectives on Politics, Political Theory, Times Higher Education as well as a number of newspapers.

Welfare economist, social scientist and activist Jean Drèze from Delhi School of Economics called Hamilton’s Amartya Sen a "lucid and lively book which will be of immense value to anyone interested in Sen’s essential ideas”. Thom Brooks, Professor of Law and Government and Dean of Durham Law School at Durham University called it a “tour de force examination of key ideas championed by Amartya Sen, well written and insightful, it’s a perfect introduction to one of the world’s greatest minds”.

University of Chicago Professor John McCormick has described Hamilton’s Freedom is Power as an impressive contribution to contemporary democratic theory, calling it both an analytically sophisticated, systematic effort in 'applied' political theory, and also a first-rate intervention into the history of political thought.

John Olushola Magbedelo from African Studies Quarterly describes Hamilton’s work in Freedom is Power as intellectually stimulating with arguments that are lucid and persuasively convincing. “The author deploys historical analysis of relevant literature systematically to evolve a theory of political representation through empirical observation of the socio-economic and political realities of South Africa,” he notes.

In his review of Are South Africans Free?, Historian and Professor Saul Dubow says that Hamilton argues that post-apartheid freedom implies more than liberation from political oppression: it requires effective power. He remarks on how Hamilton is able to “argue his case with analytical acuity, imagination, and rare precision”.

== About the SA UK Research Chair in Political Theory ==
Professor Lawrence Hamilton was awarded the SA-UK Bilateral Research Chair in Political Theory in March 2016. It is the first and only humanities and social science bilateral research chair, funded by the South African National Research Foundation and the British Academy.

The chair primarily builds research networks in political theory between the University of the Witwatersrand (Wits), South Africa, and the University of Cambridge, UK. The chair is held between the School of Social Science at Wits and the Department of Politics and International Studies (POLIS) at Cambridge.

Hamilton, through the chair, has initiated the Witwatersrand-Cambridge Exchange Programme and the Wits Seminar Series in Political Theory. The chair also offers scholarships to graduate students and research fellows to conduct research in political theory. It also hosts a blog, Critical South.

The chair has four central purposes for the two institutions:

- to build on their excellence in political theory through a vigorous exchange of ideas from two very different contexts;
- to increase the prominence and promise of political theory in South Africa, showing how the growth of political theory in South Africa is central to its transformation agenda;
- to build a vibrant exchange programme; and
- to supervise graduate students and postdoctoral fellows.

== Popular writing ==
Hamilton has founded the Critical South blog which introduces political theory and its significance in understanding politics to a wider audience. He has also written for several local and international publications including The Conversation, the Mail and Guardian, the Business Day, the Daily Maverick and the Financial Mail. Some of his most prolific commentaries include:

- What sets good and bad leadership apart in the coronavirus era
- What is the point of political theory?
- What sets good and bad leadership apart in the coronavirus era
- Ramaphosa is a breath of fresh air. But South Africans can’t relax
- New dawn, old problem: Our democratic system
- Zuma is just the face of South Africa’s democratic malaise

Hamilton has had TV and radio appearances on more than 50 media houses, including South Africa’s eNCA, SABC and Newzroom Afrika, Australia’s ABC, Spanish International News Agency EFE, Al Jazeera, NBC World News, National Public Radio, SAFM, Radio 702, providing comment and live appearance on a range of issues. These include:

- Moving Parliament in South Africa
- A Recovery Plan Following the July Riots
- Unemployment, Inequality and Revolution during and after the Covid-19 pandemic
- What should be a decent amount for people to receive from the Basic Income Grant
- How to Read Amartya Sen
