= One More for the Road =

One More for the Road may refer to:

- One More for the Road (short story collection), a 2002 collection of short stories written by Ray Bradbury
- One More for the Road (album), a 1986 album by Charles Brown
- One More for the Road, a 2017 album by Curtis Stigers

== See also ==
- One for the Road (disambiguation)
- "One for My Baby (and One More for the Road)", a song written by Harold Arlen and Johnny Mercer, popularized by Frank Sinatra
- One More from the Road, an album by Lynyrd Skynyrd
