= Alv Erlingsson =

Norwegian nobleman and pirate (died 1290)

- Earl of Sarpsborg
- Full name: Alv Erlingsson
- Born: Buskerud
- Father: Erling Alvsson of Tanberg

Alv Erlingsson (Alv Erlingsson den yngre, died 1290) was a Norwegian nobleman, earl of Sarpsborg and governor of Borgarsyssel.

Alv Erlingsson was born at Tanberg in Norderhov, Buskerud. Alv Erlingsson was the son of Erling Alvsson of Tanberg (ca. 1230–1283) and grandson of Alv Erlingsson of Tanberg (ca. 1190 – ca. 1240). Tanberg (Tornberg) was an old manor which was considered to have been among the oldest farms in Norderhov. His grandmother was Ingeborg Baardsdatter of Rein, sister of Duke Skule Bårdsson. Alv Erlingsson was also a second cousin of King Magnus VI of Norway.

With his father's death in 1283, Alv Erlingsson inherited Sarpsborg and served as governor of Borgarsyssel which today makes up the county of Østfold. Alv Erlingsson had a central role in Norwegian national governance following the death of King Magnus VI in 1280. King Magnus's heir, Eirik Magnusson was a minor and unable to take government control in his own hands. A guardianship board was established which would rule the kingdom on behalf of the king until he was of age. Alv was not included in the formal guardianship government, but had much power as governor of Borgarsyssel.

It is said he was a favorite of Ingeborg of Denmark, Queen of Norway, yet he committed countless acts of piracy throughout his life including making an attack on her son, Duke Håkon later Haakon V of Norway. The first construction of Akershus Fortress was started around the late 1290s by King Haakon V in response to earlier attack on Oslo by Alv Erlingsson.

His actions included seizing and robbing Danish and German vessels. Alv Erlingsson was eventually exiled for his acts. In the spring of 1290 Alv was caught on the coast of Scania by Danish forces. By order of the King of Denmark, Alv was sentenced to death and was executed outside Helsingborg.

== In modern literature ==
Alv Erlingsson plays an important role in the early parts of Sigrid Undset's The Master of Hestviken series, based on the writer's research in historical sources. The tetralogy's protagonist Olav Audunsson, as a violent young man outlawed and forced into exile, takes service with Alv Erlingsson whom he met in Denmark, and comes back with him to Norway at the time of Erlingsson's prominence in the Kingdom's affairs. Audunsson is depicted as speaking of him with boundless admiration:

"(...) I was a happy man the day I met with Earl Alf - when I took the oath to him on the hilt, I almost thought I had come home.(...) We would follow him - if he bade us sail across the smoking lake of hell - every man he looks at when he laughs. These yellow eyes of his shine like gems. Small he is, and low - I am a head taller, I wis - and broad as the door of a house, shaggy and brown and curly haired; ay, the Tornberg race comes of a King's daughter and a bear, they say. And Earl Alf has the strength of ten men and the wits of twelve. And there are not many men, I ween, who are not glad and thankful to obey him - nor many women either-".

In later parts, Olav Audunsson keeps steadfast to the Earl also after his downfall, and loyally follows him into exile in Sweden, to the great detriment of Audunsson's own personal affairs - until Alv Erlingsson himself releases him from his oath, to return to Norway and reclaim his ancestral manor of Hestviken and his long-suffering bride.

Also many years later, the protagonist cherishes the Earl's memory:

(...) You must know, sir, that I was Alf Erlingsson's liegeman in my youth, and I swore by God and by my patron saint, when I heard the earl had died in banishment, that never would I swear any other allegiance on the hilt of my sword, and least of all to the man who made him an outlaw" [i.e. King Haakon V].

== See also ==
- Audun Hugleiksson

== Related reading ==
- Yrwing, Hugo: Alf Erlingssons olycköde. En studie kring et dokumentfynd (Stockholm, 1956)
- Skeie, Tore: Alv Erlingsson. En undersøkelse av en aktørs rolle i nordiske konflikter på 1280-tallet (University of Oslo, 2006)
- Skeie, Tore: Alv Erlingsson. Fortellingen om en adelsmanns undergang (University of Oslo, 2009)
- Helle, Knut Konge og gode menn i norsk riksstyring ca. 1150-1319 (Universitetsforlaget. 1972)
- Munch, Peder Andreas Det norske folks historie (Christiania: 1859)
