= The Bougainville Photoplay Project =

2010 play by Paul Dwyer

- Author: Paul Dwyer
- Language: English
- Genre: Play
- Publisher: Currency Press
- Publication date: 2010
- Publication place: Australia
- Media type: Print (Paperback)
- ISBN: 978-0-86819-891-0

The Bougainville Photoplay Project is a verbatim play by Paul Dwyer and Version 1.0.

== Plot ==
Writer, academic and performer Paul Dwyer looks back at trips made by his father, Allan Dwyer, an orthopaedic surgeon who visited Bougainville in the 1960s, healing crippled children.

== First production ==
The Bougainville Photoplay Project was first performed at the National Multicultural Festival Fringe in Canberra in February 2008, with the following participants:

Paul Dwyer: Researcher and storyteller

David Williams: Director and stage manager

Sean Bacon: Video artist

Subsequent performances have been for the Liveworks Festival at the Performance Space, Sydney (2008); at the Old Fitzroy Theatre, Sydney (2009); and a Mobile States Tour for Performing Lines (2010) which toured to Arts House at North Melbourne Town Hall, Darwin Arts Festival at Browns Mart Theatre, Powerhouse Arts Centre in Brisbane, and Perth Institute of Contemporary Arts.
