= Laleh Khadivi =

Iranian American novelist, and filmmaker (born 1977)

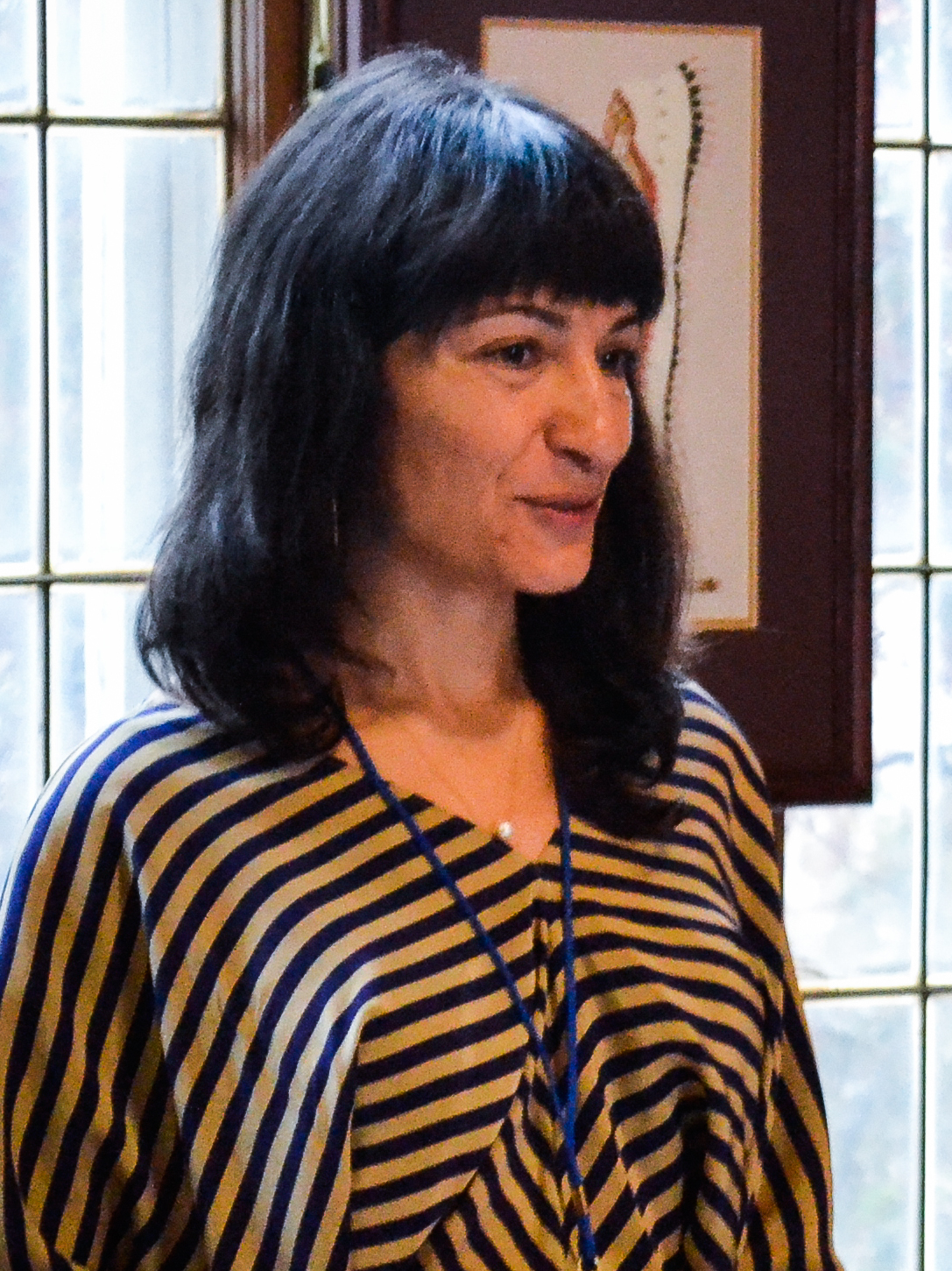
- Khadivi in 2013
- Born: 1977 (age 48–49); Isfahan, Iran
- Citizenship: United States of America
- Education: Reed College; Mills College
- Occupations: Filmmaker; Novelist

Laleh Khadivi (born 1977) is an Iranian American novelist, and filmmaker.

== Life ==
Khadivi was born to a Kurdish family in Esfahan, Iran, in 1977. Shortly after the Iranian Revolution, she emigrated to the United States with her family in 1979, settling in the San Francisco Bay Area. She received a B.A. in 1998 from Reed College and an MFA in 2006 from Mills College. In 2002 she began to research the Kurds, particularly their fate in the southwestern region of Iran under the first Shah. Her first novel, The Age of Orphans, is the story of a Kurdish boy whose father is killed in a battle with the Iranian army in 1921. The boy is captured, becomes a soldier and eventually is turned into an oppressor of his own people.

Khadivi has worked extensively as a documentary filmmaker. She taught at Emory University as the 2007–2009 Fiction Fellow. She also taught creative writing at Santa Clara University during the 2010–2011 school year. She resides in San Francisco, California, where she is a professor in the Writing department at University of San Francisco. Her debut novel, The Age of Orphans, has been translated into Dutch, Hebrew, and Italian.

== Awards ==
- 2008 Whiting Award
- Carl Djerassi Fellowship
- Emory Fiction Fellowship
- Soros Foundation Award

== Works ==
=== Books ===
- A Map to the Dead. Mills College. 2006 (thesis/dissertation)
- The Age of Orphans. McClelland & Stewart. 2009. ISBN 978-0-7710-9571-9.
- The Walking. Bloomsbury USA. 2013. ISBN 978-1-5969-1699-9.
- A Good Country. Bloomsbury USA. 2017. ISBN 978-1-6328-6584-7.
- Female life on planet earth. New York, NY: Ecco. 2026. ISBN 978-0-06-351424-9.

=== Films ===
- 900 Women (2001)

=== Stories ===
- "Air and Water", Virginia Quarterly Review, Winter 2009
