= Crossed Swords: Pakistan, Its Army, and the Wars Within =

2008 book by Shuja Nawaz

- Author: Shuja Nawaz
- Language: English
- Published: 2008 (OUP)
- Publication place: Pakistan
- Media type: Print (Hardback)
- Pages: 655 + xliv
- ISBN: 9780195476606
- OCLC: 611175599

Crossed Swords: Pakistan, Its Army, and the Wars Within is a 2008 book by Shuja Nawaz. It is a detailed study of the military's involvement in the evolution of Pakistan.

== Reception ==
Pakistan Vision wrote "What distinguishes this book from other works on Pakistan’s military is that other works have devoted a chapter on the military’s role in politics separately. This book on the other hand travels through a historical frame by discussing military adventures, wars and the military’s peace-time activities along with the politics and process of governance." and "Shuja Nawaz’s book is a valuable addition to existing literature on Pakistani politics with special reference to the role of the armed forces in the nation building politics and security of Pakistan. .. Despite its pro-military bias, the book remains interesting and provides much material for academic debate." The Journal of Military History wrote that Crossed Swords "is a detailed and fascinating account of the army, in peace and in wartime, through the lens of one not actually part of the organisation, yet possessed of a thorough appreciation of its ethos." and concluded "This is a thorough and stimulating book, and highly recommended."

The Reviewer's Bookwatch in its review highlighted various errors in the book and ended with "Shuja has burnt his midnight oil. He has compiled and collected all the facts in a nice way but his analysis has been shallow. We expected something far more profound than this. 600 pages written in vain."

It has also been reviewed by the London Review of Books, the Harvard International Review, and The Journal of Asian Studies.

== See also ==
- Indo-Pakistani wars and conflicts
- Kargil War
- Indo-Pakistani War of 1971
