= Tore Skeie =

Norwegian author and historian (born 1977)

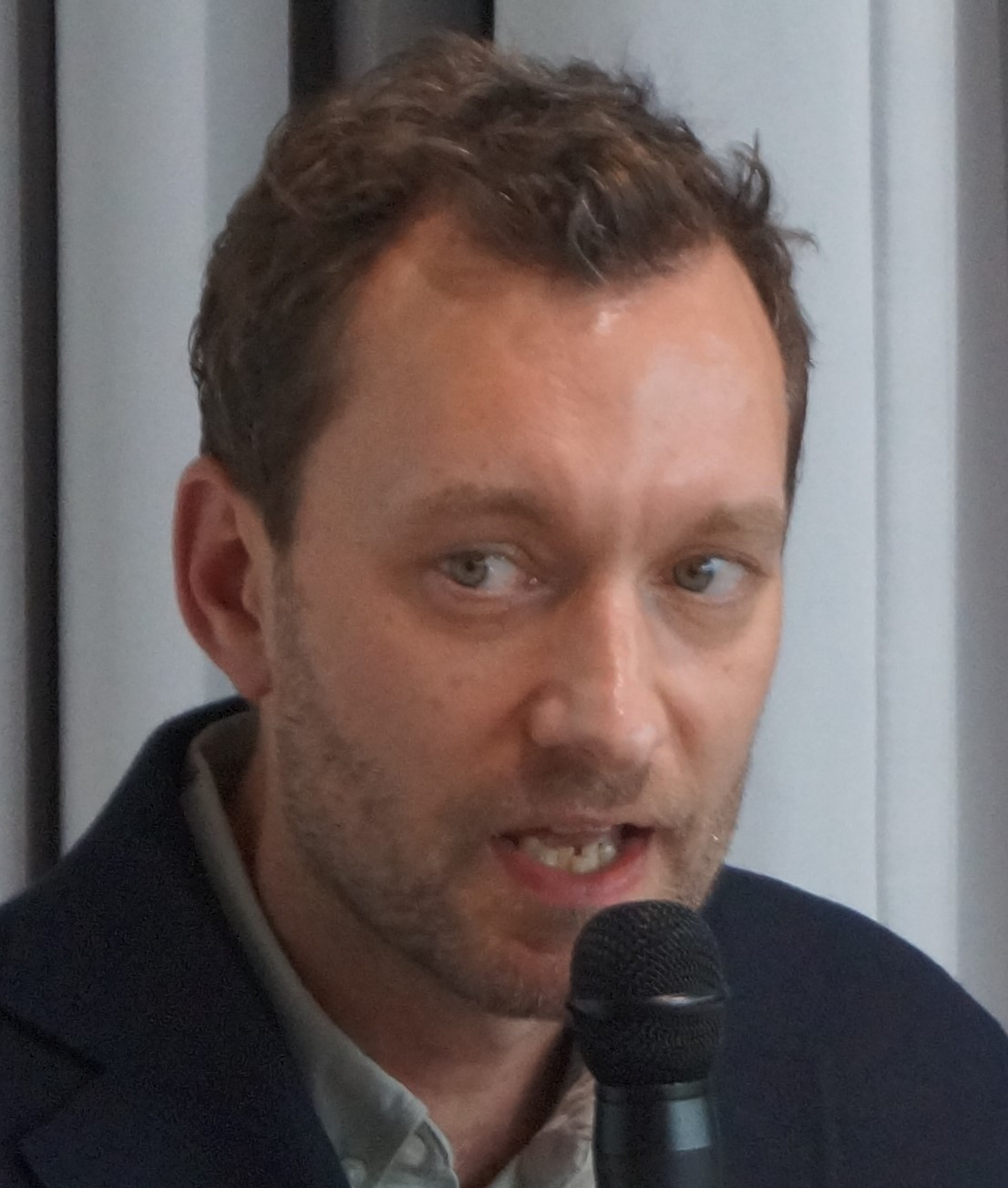
- Skeie in 2019
- Born: 1977 (age 48–49); Gjøvik, Norway
- Education: University of Oslo
- Occupations: Author; Historian
- Years active: 2008–present

Tore Skeie (born 1977) is a Norwegian author and historian specializing in medieval Norwegian history. His first book, written about Norwegian nobleman Alv Erlingsson, won him NOK 100,000 in a history competition and became a bestseller for its publisher. His third book, published in 2018, led to him receiving the Sverre Steen Award and a ten-year stipend from the Arts Council Norway worth NOK 268,222 annually.

== Biography ==
Skeie was born in 1977 and is from Gjøvik. He studied at the Blindern campus of the University of Oslo, where he graduated with a master's degree in history, basing his thesis on Alv Erlingsson. After graduating, Skeie adapted Erlingsson's story into a book, Alv Erlingsson: fortellingen om en adelsmanns undergang (Alv Erlingsson: The Story of a Nobleman's Downfall). While writing the book, Skeie faced severe financial hardship and had to work other jobs to pay his bills. His work won Norwegian publisher Spartacus Forlag's History Competition in 2008; the competition's judges called Skeie's book a "narrative achievement" and awarded him the grand prize of NOK 100,000. The book was published by Spartacus the following year and received positive reviews; despite initial difficulties getting the book to store shelves, it became the publisher's bestseller by the end of 2009.

Skeie published his second book, Jomfruen fra Norge (The Virgin of Norway), in 2012, also with Spartacus. The book detailed the complex royal alliances and power struggles in early 14th-century Scandinavia. Sven Egil Omdal of Stavanger Aftenblad called it "extremely engaging". At the same time, Bjarne Tveiten of Fædrelandsvennen thought it was "good" but criticized it for not being as exciting as Steie's previous work.

Skeie published his third book, Hvitekrist: om Olav Haraldsson og hans tid (White Christ: about Olav Haraldsson and his era), in 2018 with publisher Gyldendal. It was translated into English by Alison McCollough, his first such book, and was published by Pushkin Press under the title The Wolf Age: The Vikings, the Anglo-Saxons, and the Battle for the North Sea Empire. Leif Ekle of NRK described it as "enthralling" and "well written", and Jonathan McAloon of the Financial Times wrote that its English translation had the "energy of an epic television show". Following the book's publication, he received a ten-year stipend from the Arts Council Norway worth NOK 268,222 annually, which was granted to him to allow him to focus more heavily on his nonfiction work. The book also won him the Sverre Steen Award from the Norwegian Historical Association in 2019, which cited his "masterful use of language, able to bring older Norwegian history to new generations of readers."

== Bibliography ==
- Alv Erlingsson: fortellingen om en adelsmanns undergang (2008)
- Jomfruen fra Norge (2012)
- Hvitekrist: om Olav Haraldsson og hans tid (2018)
