= Philosophy and Real Politics =

2008 book by Raymond Geuss

- Author: Raymond Geuss
- Language: English
- Genre: Political philosophy
- Publisher: Princeton University Press
- Publication date: 2008
- Publication place: United Kingdom, United States
- Media type: Print (Hardback and Paperback)
- Pages: 116
- ISBN: 0-691-13788-9
- OCLC: 190842604
- Dewey Decimal: 320.01 22
- LC Class: JA71 .G46 2008

Philosophy and Real Politics is a 2008 book by American philosopher and scholar Raymond Geuss whose main subject is the relationship between politics and human needs. The book is an expansion of a lecture given at the University of Athens in April 2007 under the title "Lenin, Rawls and Political Philosophy". Geuss argues that the contemporary hegemonic view of politics as applied ethics is the result of certain western philosophical traditions, and that recent social conflicts call this understanding into question. Geuss instead argues that politics should be understood as a skill or a craft that allows people and groups to gain and exercise power. The book has been regarded as a significant contribution to the social sciences.

== Part 1: Realism ==
The first part of the book deals with what Geuss calls the 'realist approach to political philosophy'. According to him, since Hobbes this approach has been persistent among political scientists but it tends to overlook the fact that historical and geographical differences among societies and cultures play a major role in the concepts of 'order' and 'intolerable disorder'. Geuss notes that nowadays the freedom to own private firearms is generally rejected in western European societies, while in the United States this is something considered natural. The way a given society adopts cultural and behavioural traits may be completely different from, and sometimes, opposed to, another; leading to conflicts and frictions that are perfectly supported by either side but incomprehensible to third parties.

== Part 2: Failures of Realism ==
Part two is devoted to the failures of the realist approach in political philosophy. The author discusses a variety of concepts such as equality, fairness, ignorance and impartiality. Using many examples from history (William Morris' utopias, Kantian philosophy) and everyday social life, Geuss concludes that those concepts are subject to many conditions and a closer inspection is needed in order to overcome their apparent universality. Then, politics is not a framework of theories, Geuss argues, but more like a skill or a craft that needs to be practised and improved through critical inspection.

== See also ==
- John Rawls
- Philosophy and the Mirror of Nature
