= Robert Denoon Cumming =

American historian and philosopher

Robert Denoon Cumming (October 27, 1916 – 25 August 2004) was a Canadian-American philosopher and historian of twentieth-century Continental philosophy, especially phenomenology. He taught at Columbia University from 1948 to 1985, when he retired as Frederick E. Woodbridge professor emeritus of philosophy.

== Life ==
Born in Cape Breton Island, Nova Scotia, Cumming grew up in Bangor, Maine. He graduated from Harvard University in 1938 with an A.B. in classics, summa cum laude, and was elected to Phi Beta Kappa. He then studied at New College, Oxford, as a Rhodes Scholar. During World War II he served in U.S. military intelligence, liaising with the Free French Forces and earning the French Croix de Guerre, the Legion of Merit, and the Purple Heart.

After the war he studied at the Sorbonne, gaining his PhD in philosophy from the University of Chicago in 1950 under the supervision of Richard McKeon. Appointed instructor at Columbia University in 1948, he stayed at the university until his retirement in 1985. He was chairman of the Columbia philosophy department from 1961 to 1964.

== Works ==
- (revised tr., with intro.) Euthyphro, Apology, and Crito, and the death scene from Phaedo by Plato. 1948.
- (ed. with intro.) The philosophy of Jean-Paul Sartre by Jean-Paul Sartre. 1965
- Human Nature and History; a study of the development of liberal political thought, 1969.
- Starting Point: an introduction to the dialectic of existence, 1979.
- Phenomenology and Deconstruction: The dream is over, 1991.
- Method and Imagination, 1992
- Solitude, 2001
- Breakdown in Communication, 2002
