= Dave Freeman (American author) =

American writer (1961–2008)

David Stewart Freeman (February 21, 1961 – August 17, 2008) was an American advertising executive. Freeman was best known for co-authoring the 1999 book 100 Things to Do Before You Die with his friend Neil Teplica. It was based on the Web site whatsgoingon.com, which the pair ran together from 1996 to 2001. The book's recommendations ranged from attending the Academy Awards and running with the bulls in Pamplona, Spain, to the more obscure, like taking a voodoo pilgrimage in Haiti and "land diving" in Vanuatu, which Freeman once called "the original bungee jumping". The success of 100 Things spawned numerous similar compendia of essential places and things such as 1,000 Places to See Before You Die, leaving a legacy of "... Before You Die" and "Before You Turn 40" books still in the bestseller charts today.

== Biography ==
Freeman was born in Whittier, California. He graduated from the University of Southern California in 1983 with a bachelor's degree in urban planning. He worked in advertising for his whole professional career, including jobs at agencies Grey Advertising and TBWA\Chiat\Day. On September 11, 2001, Freeman watched the second plane hit the World Trade Center from his apartment just blocks away. He moved back to Southern California to be closer to his family.

Freeman died in his Venice, California, home on August 17, 2008, after falling and hitting his head. He was 47. At the time of his death, the Los Angeles Times noted that Freeman had seen "about half the sites" in his book.
