= Tommy's War =

Tommy's War: A First World War Diary 1913-1918
- HarperCollins Edition
- Author: Thomas Cairns Livingstone
- Language: English
- Genre: Diary
- Publisher: HarperCollins (London)
- Publication date: 15 September 2008
- Publication place: United Kingdom
- Media type: Print (Hardback)
- Pages: 352 pp (Paperback edition)
- ISBN: 978-0-00-728067-4 (Hardback edition)
- OCLC: 231883143

Tommy's War: A First World War Diary 1913–1918 is a diary written by Thomas Cairns Livingstone.

Written by Cairns Livingstone, a mercantile book-keeper, the diaries cover a period from 1913 to 1933, began shortly after he, his wife Agnes and their son Wee Tommy moved to the Govanhill area of Glasgow in 1913.

The diaries remained largely unknown for much of the 20th century. The diary was passed on to his son and after his death in 1995 eventually turned up at an auction in Northumberland in 2005.

The diaries were bought by an amateur historian, Shaun Sewell for £300. Two years later the BBC television programme The Antiques Roadshow visited Alnwick Castle in Northumberland and Sewell, who was only in the area for a cricket match, took the diaries along. They were featured on the programme and alerted the interest of 12 publishers. HarperCollins won an auction for the rights and the first volume, covering the period 1913 to 1918 was published in September 2008, with a foreword by the broadcaster and historian Andrew Marr.

The diaries cover the day-to-day lives of his working-class family in Glasgow, their trials and tribulations. He also records the minutiae and privations of their everyday life and the city of Glasgow. He also writes about his thoughts on the news of the day and the way they were affected by World War I. The diaries are written in a copperplate script, with some passages in Latin and French, illustrated with his own idiosyncratic drawings.

The paperback was released on Thursday 28 May 2009.

In 2010 a sequel was released called Tommy's Peace: A family diary 1919–1933 written by Livingstone, covering an everyday life in the inter-war period.
