= Jim Holt (philosopher) =

American author (born 1954)

Jim Holt (born 30 October 1954) is an American journalist, popular-science author, and essayist.

He has contributed to The New York Times, The New York Times Magazine, The New York Review of Books, The New Yorker, The American Scholar, and Slate.

In 1997 he was editor of The New Leader, a political magazine. His book Why Does the World Exist? was a 2013 New York Times bestseller.

== Career ==
For ten years Holt hosted a weekly radio spot on BBC Wales, "Living in America, with Jim Holt". He has appeared on William F. Buckley's Firing Line, NBC News with Tom Brokaw, CNN, and had a brief appearance in an episode of Billy on the Street in which he ended an impromptu interview after his interlocutor insisted he reveal his sexuality.

== Awards and honors ==
- 2012 National Book Critics Circle Award, finalist, Why Does the World Exist?
- 2012 The Philosophers Magazine named his book, Why Does the World Exist? as one of the best books of 2012.

== Publications ==
=== Books ===
- Stop Me If You've Heard This: A History and Philosophy of Jokes New York: W.W. Norton, 2008. ISBN 9780393066739, OCLC 181139422
- Why Does the World Exist?: An Existential Detective Story London: Profile, 2011. ISBN 9781846682445, OCLC 749995335
- When Einstein Walked With Gödel: Excursions to the Edge of Thought Farrar, Straus & Giroux, 2018. ISBN 9780374146702, OCLC 1033594308

=== Articles ===
- "The Power of Catastrophic Thinking" (review of Toby Ord, The Precipice: Existential Risk and the Future of Humanity, Hachette, 2020, 468 pp.), The New York Review of Books, vol. LXVIII, no. 3 (February 25, 2021), pp. 26–29. Jim Holt writes (p. 28): "Whether you are searching for a cure for cancer, or pursuing a scholarly or artistic career, or engaged in establishing more just institutions, a threat to the future of humanity is also a threat to the significance of what you do."
