= Horizon in the Middle of Nowhere =

Japanese light novel series franchise

- Cover of the first light novel volume

境界線上のホライゾン (Kyōkaisen-jō no Horaizon)
- Light novel
- Written by: Minoru Kawakami
- Illustrated by: Satoyasu
- Published by: ASCII Media Works
- Imprint: Dengeki Bunko
- Magazine: Dengeki Bunko Magazine
- Original run: September 10, 2008 – December 7, 2018
- Volumes: 29 + 3 spin-offs
- Manga
- Written by: Minoru Kawakami
- Illustrated by: Hideo Takenaka
- Published by: ASCII Media Works
- Magazine: Dengeki Daioh
- Original run: August 27, 2011 – March 27, 2015
- Volumes: 6
- Anime television series
- Directed by: Manabu Ono
- Written by: Tatsuhiko Urahata
- Music by: Tatsuya Kato
- Studio: Sunrise
- Licensed by: AUS: Madman Entertainment; NA: Sentai Filmworks; UK: Manga Entertainment
- Original network: MBS, CTC, tvk, TV Saitama, Tokyo MX, TV Aichi
- Original run: October 1, 2011 – September 29, 2012
- Episodes: 26 + 1 OVA
- Manga

Kyōkaisen-jō no Horako-san
- Written by: Minoru Kawakami
- Illustrated by: Kuraun Hani
- Published by: ASCII Media Works
- Magazine: Dengeki G's Magazine
- Original run: October 27, 2011 – October 10, 2012
- Volumes: 1
- Video game

Kyōkaisen-jō no Horizon Portable
- Developer: Tenky
- Publisher: Kadokawa Shoten
- Genre: RPG
- Platform: PlayStation Portable
- Released: JP: April 25, 2013
- icon

Horizon in the Middle of Nowhere (Note: Known in Japan as Kyōkaisen-jō no Horaizon (境界線上のホライゾン; lit. Horizon on the Borderline)) is a Japanese light novel series written by Minoru Kawakami and illustrated by Satoyasu. The series is set in the distant future when Japan has been conquered by other countries and divided up into feudal territories. The series is part of a six-stage (particularly the fourth one, called "Genesis") chronicle universe, with Minoru's other light novels (including Owari no Chronicle, the series pre-prequel) encompassing the other five. A 13-episode anime adaptation by Sunrise aired between October and December 2011. A 13-episode second season aired between July and September 2012. Both seasons have been licensed and released on DVD and Blu-ray by Sentai Filmworks in North America and Manga Entertainment in the UK. A video game adaptation for the PlayStation Portable titled Horizon in the Middle of Nowhere Portable (Note: Known in Japan as Kyōkaisen-jō no Horizon Portable (境界線上のホライゾン Portable; lit. Horizon on the Borderline Portable)) was developed by Tenky, and was released in Japan on April 25, 2013.

== Plot ==
In the far future, humans abandon a devastated Earth and travel to outer space. However, due to an unknown phenomenon that prevents them from traveling into space, humanity returns to Earth only to find it inhospitable except for Japan. To accommodate the entire human population, pocket dimensions are created around Japan to house the returned populace. In order to find a way to return to outer space, the humans begin reenacting human history according to the Holy Book Testament. But in the year 1413 of the Testament Era, due to the destruction of the land created above Japan for the reenactment which was called the Divine Realm, the nations of the pocket dimensions split Japan's territory into several "Divine States" most of which are ruled over by Japanese noble families of which the "Far East" of Japan is represented and the flying ship Musashi is the location of the Far East's academy. Musashi circles Japan and periodically docks in Far East Divine State territory. It is now the year 1648 of the Testament Era, and the Divine States are monitored by the Testament Union, the authority that runs the re-enactment of history. However, rumors of an apocalypse and war begin to spread when the Testament stops revealing what happened after 1648. Taking advantage of this situation, Tori Aoi, head of Musashi Ariadust Academy's Supreme Federation and President of the student council, uses this opportunity to lead his classmates and try to prevent the apocalypse and bring humanity into a better future.

== Media ==
=== Light novels ===
Horizon in the Middle of Nowhere began as serial light novel series published in Dengeki Bunko Magazine in 2008. Twenty-nine compilation volumes covering eleven separate arcs have been published by ASCII Media Works' imprint Dengeki Bunko. In 2012, it was #13 in the 2012 ranking of top-selling light novels by series with 409,949 estimated copies sold.

=== Manga ===
A manga adaptation illustrated by Hideo Takenaka was serialized between October 2011 and May 2015 issues of ASCII Media Works' manga magazine Dengeki Daioh and was collected into six volumes. A second, four-panel comic strip manga, illustrated by Kuraun Hani and titled Kyōkaisen-jō no Horako-san (境界線上のホラ子さん), was serialized in between the January 2012 and November 2012 issues of ASCII Media Works' Dengeki G's Magazine and was collected into one volume.

=== Video game ===
A video game adaptation for PlayStation Portable was developed by Tenky and released in Japan on April 25, 2013. The game is an RPG, the story is partially based on the anime and the novels but also includes an original scenario, with more than 80 characters from both media making an appearance. The game sold more than 26,000 copies in its first week after launch.

=== Anime ===
An anime television series based on the light novel was announced in the March 2011 issue of Dengeki Bunko Magazine. Produced by Sunrise, the anime series debuted in Japan on October 1, 2011. The series has been licensed by Sentai Filmworks in North America and was simulcasted through the Anime Network on October 4, 2011, followed by a home video release in 2012. Sentai has also licensed the second season for streaming and home video release in 2013. The opening theme song for the first season is "TERMINATED" by Minori Chihara. The first ending theme used is "Pieces -Side Ariadust-" by AiRI and the second ending theme used is "Stardust Melodia -Side Horizon-" by Ceui. For the second season, the opening theme is "ZONE//ALONE" by Minori Chihara. The first ending theme is "Kanashimi wa Dare no Negai Demonai -Side Sunset-" (悲しみは誰の願いデモナイ -Side Sunset-) by Aira Yūki and the second ending theme is "Sora no Uta -Side Sunrise-" (空の詩 -Side Sunrise-) by Masami Okui. A bonus OVA episode was released with the Blu-ray Disc box set on December 21, 2018.
