= Jimmy's Stars =

Young-Adult Novel

- First edition
- Author: Mary Ann Rodman
- Language: English
- Genre: young adult novel
- Publisher: Farrar, Straus & Giroux
- Publication date: 2008
- Publication place: United States
- Media type: Print (Hardback)
- Pages: 257 pp
- ISBN: 0-374-33703-9
- OCLC: 86109697
- LC Class: PZ7.R6166 Jim 2008

Jimmy's Stars is a children's historical novel by the American writer Mary Ann Rodman.

It is set in 1943 Pittsburgh, Pennsylvania against the backdrop of World War II and tells the story of eleven-year-old Ellie McKelvey, protagonist of this novel. Her older brother Jimmy, however, is drafted and she and her family struggle to keep up their hope for him.

== Reviews ==
"Packed with intimate details about life in America during World War II, this book will leave readers with a meaningful picture of what it was like to live through those very hard years."
