= Minoru Kawakami =

Japanese author of light novels (born 1975)

- Born: Minoru Kawakami (川上稔, Kawakami Minoru); 3 January 1975 (age 51)
- Occupations: Author video game designer
- Writing career
- Genres: Science fiction Fantasy
- Notable works: Horizon in the Middle of Nowhere; The Ending Chronicle
- Website: www.din.or.jp/~arm/

Minoru Kawakami (川上稔, Kawakami Minoru) is a Japanese author of light novels, best known as the author of the Horizon in the Middle of Nowhere and The Ending Chronicle light novel series.

== Career ==
After graduating from the Faculty of Economics at Josai University, Kawakami got a job at the video game development company TENKY. He worked on games such as Merriment Carrying Caravan, Sougakutoshi OSAKA and Twelve: Sengoku Fushinden.

In 1996, he made his debut as a writer by attaining the Gold Prize at the Dengeki Novel Prize for his novel Panzerpolis 1935. His notable works as a writer include The Ending Chronicle and Horizon in the Middle of Nowhere, which are set within the same canonical universe dubbed the Toshi Sekai or City World and span different eras of said universe.

Satoyasu, who also works for TENKY, has been illustrator for Kawakami's work since his third novel, Feng Shui Street Hong Kong. His debut work, Panzerpolis 1935, was illustrated by Shirou Ohno, and his second work, Aerial City, was illustrated by Koji Nakakita.

== Writing style ==
He writes long stories in a unique style that uses a lot of line breaks and stylistic devices such as taigendome, where a sentence ends with a taigen or indeclinable nominal instead of a copula. Many of his works are filled with originally coined words and philosophies with extensive usage of glossaries.

Kawakami's novels are well known for their length, sometimes spanning one-thousand pages in a single volume. Due to this, his work contain by far the longest individual volumes published by Dengeki Bunko. In the final seven volumes of The Ending Chronicle, Kawakami finally surpassed 1,000 pages for the first time in the history of Dengeki Bunko (1,091 pages), an unprecedented feat for a light novel paperback. The record was broken again with the publishing of Horizon in the Middle of Nowhere II Part 2 (1,153 pages) and then again with the final volume of the series Horizon in the Middle of Nowhere XI Part 3 (1,160 pages).

== Works ==
Most of Kawakami's works are set in a universe of his own creation. The history of this universe is divided into eras. Works set in the universe are labelled by the era they take place in (for instance Horizon in the Middle of Nowhere is the first series to take place in the GENESIS era, and is thus sometimes referred to as "the 1st GENESIS"). The eras are as follows, listed in chronological order:

- FORTH
- AHEAD
- EDGE
- GENESIS
- OBSTACLE
- CITY / LINKS

=== Novels ===
==== CITY Series ====
- Panzerpolis 1935 (パンツァーポリス1935) (1996, 1 volume)
- Aerial City (エアリアルシティ) (1997, 1 volume)
- Tune Bust City Hong Kong (風水街都 香港) (1998, 2 volumes)
- Noise City Osaka (奏（騒）楽都市OSAKA) (1999, 2 volumes)
- Closed City Paris (閉鎖都市 巴里) (1999–2000, 2 volumes)
- Panzerpolis Berlin (機甲都市 伯林) (2000–2001, 5 volumes)
- Virtual City DT (電詞都市DT) (2002, 2 volumes)
- Image City SF (創雅都市S.F) (2003, 1 volume, mail order only)
- Zenon City Tokyo (矛盾都市TOKYO) (2005, 1 volume, mail order only)

==== AHEAD Series ====
- The Ending Chronicle (終わりのクロニクル) (2003–2005, 14 volumes)

==== FORTH Series ====
- Rapid-fire King (連射王) (2007, reprinted 2013, 2 volumes)

==== GENESIS Series ====
- Horizon in the Middle of Nowhere (境界線上のホライゾン) (2008–2018, 29 volumes + 3 extra)

==== OBSTACLE Series ====
- Clash in the Hexennacht (激突のヘクセンナハト) (2015–2017, 4 volumes)

==== EDGE Series ====
- On a Godless Planet (神々のいない星で) (published online 2018–, in print 2019–, 6 volumes)

==== LINKS Series ====
- Fangaku!! Tokyo Depths School Life Speedrun (ファン学!! 東京大空洞スクールライフRTA) (published online 2023– in print 2024–, 1 volume)

== Awards ==
- Dengeki Novel Prize
  - 1996 – Gold Prize, Panzerpolis 1935
- Kono Light Novel ga Sugoi!
  - 2005 – 3rd place in Best Male Character, Mikoto Sayama, The Ending Chronicle
  - 2006 – 5th place in Best Novel Series, The Ending Chronicle
  - 2006 – 2nd place in Best Male Character, Mikoto Sayama, The Ending Chronicle
  - 2007 – 7th place in Best Novel Series, The Ending Chronicle
  - 2007 – 1st place in Best Male Character, Mikoto Sayama, The Ending Chronicle
  - 2013 – 10th place in Best Novel Series, Horizon in the Middle of Nowhere
  - 2013 – 10th place in Best Male Character, Toori Aoi, Horizon in the Middle of Nowhere
