= The Daily Coyote =

The Daily Coyote is an autobiographical book written by Shreve Stockton, and published by Simon & Schuster in 2008. It chronicles Stockton's relocation to Wyoming, after living in New York, and her adjustment to the changes. During this time, she is given a ten-day-old coyote pup which she raises. The book describes the joys and troubles she experiences raising a coyote, and details how she started a blog where she would daily post a picture of the coyote. The name of the blog, "The Daily Coyote", gave rise to the book's title.
