= Jules Archer =

American historian (1915–2008)

- Born: January 27, 1915
- Died: November 13, 2008 (aged 93)
- Education: DeWitt Clinton High School; College of the City of New York

Jules Archer (January 27, 1915 – November 13, 2008) was an American author who wrote many volumes of non-fiction history for a general audience and for young adults.

Archer attended DeWitt Clinton High School in New York City and the College of the City of New York, where he received a degree in advertising.

Archer served four years during World War II with the Army Air Forces in the Pacific theater. He wrote many books on U.S. history, political events, and personalities, including The Plot to Seize the White House: The Shocking True Story of the Conspiracy to Overthrow FDR, and Jungle Fighters: A G.I. War Correspondent's Experiences in the New Guinea Campaign.

Archer lived the remainder of his life in Scotts Valley, California. His papers are held by the University of Oregon Libraries.

== Publications ==
- Twentieth Century Caesar Benito Mussolini 1964
- Front-Line General Douglas MacArthur 1965
- Man of Steel Joseph Stalin, Julian Messner 1965
- Fighting Journalist Horace Greeley 1966
- Battlefield President Dwight D. Eisenhower 1967
- Angry Abolitionist William Loyd Garrison, New York: Julian Messner 1969
- The Philippines' Fight for Freedom, Crowell-Collier Press 1970, ISBN 978-0-02-705640-2
- 1968: Year of Crisis, New York: Julian Messner 1971, ISBN 978-0-671-32407-0
- Treason in America: Disloyalty Versus Dissent, E. P. Dutton 1971, ISBN 978-0-8015-7932-5
- Mao Tse-Tung, 1972
- The Plot to Seize the White House, 1973/2007
- Ho Chi Minh: Legend of Hanoi, Bailey Bros. & Swinfen 1973, ISBN 978-0-561-00153-1
- Mexico and the United States, 1973
- Resistance, 1973
- They Made a Revolution, 1776, 1975
- Who's Running Your Life?: A Look at Young People's Rights, Harcourt Brace Jovanovich 1979, ISBN 978-0-15-296058-2
- You Can't Do That to Me: Famous Fights for Human Rights, 1980, ISBN 0027056007
- Winners and Losers: How Elections Work in America, 1984
- The Incredible Sixties: The Stormy Years That Changed America, 1986
- They Had a Dream: The Civil Rights Struggle from Frederick Douglass to Marcus Garvey to Martin Luther King, Jr. and Malcolm X, 1996, Puffin Books, ISBN 0140349545
- Breaking Barriers: The Feminist Revolution from Susan B. Anthony to Margaret ..., 1998
