= Stop Me If You've Heard This: A History and Philosophy of Jokes =

2008 non-fiction book by Jim Holt

- Softcover edition
- Author: Jim Holt
- Language: English
- Subject: Philosophy of humor
- Genre: Non-fiction
- Publisher: W. W. Norton & Company
- Publication date: 17 July 2008
- Publication place: United States
- Media type: Print, e-book
- Pages: 160
- ISBN: 978-0393066739
- OCLC: 181139422
- Followed by: Why Does the World Exist?

Stop Me If You've Heard This: A History and Philosophy of Jokes is the debut full-length nonfiction book written by American philosopher Jim Holt. The book was initially published on 17 July 2008 by W. W. Norton & Company. The text attempts to analyze the history, nature, and philosophical motivation of the joke from the ancient Athens stand-up comics to the today's comedy-club performers, discussing such forms of jokes as racial, political, and sexual humor. The book is based on his 2004 article for The New Yorker.

== Reception ==
The book was widely discussed by critics, generating polarized reviews.

William Grimes of The Scotsman mentioned "In the end, Holt seems less interested in getting to the bottom of his subject than he is in getting to the end of his assignment. "Slight" would be too weighty a word for this soap bubble of a book. Even after being plumped out with illustrations, it barely qualifies as a stocking stuffer. Even worse, the jokes are feeble." A reviewer of The Week stated "Plato and Aristotle had a low opinion of humor. The Greeks believed that laughter resulted from a sudden surge in one's sense of superiority, that it was derisive at its core. Contemporary research confirms that theory to a degree. It explains the research chimp that urinates on his trainer's shoulders and then uses sign language to indicate “funny.” But what about the chimp who tries to amuse its minders by calling a purse a “shoe” and then putting it on her foot, asks science writer Jim Holt. And what explains the popularity of puns? Clearly, we all have the capacity to laugh without putting someone else down." Natalie Haynes of New Humanist commented "The philosophy section is pretty limited as well – it's actually a history of the philosophy of humour, rather than anything more incisive or original. Infuriatingly, the focus shifts from the very specific types of joke in the first, historical section (what I would call gags) to a much broader spectrum – “the aesthetic category of the humorous, the comical, or the funny”. One wonders why the editor didn't notice that the two halves didn't add up to a satisfying or even especially coherent whole." J. Peder Zane of PopMatters gave the book eight stars ouf of 10, stating "Stop Me If You've Heard This is a fun and lively book that manages to avoid the pitfall suggested in Jim Holt's nominee for the best short joke ever: "Pretentious? Moi?" Not this time!"

== See also ==
- Gershon Legman
