= Beneath My Mother's Feet =

- Author: Amjed (Qamar) McDonnell
- Language: English
- Publication date: 2008

Beneath My Mother's Feet is a young adult novel by author Amjed (Qamar) McDonnell. It was published in 2008 by Simon & Schuster. The paperback edition was released in 2011 and is widely read in social studies curricula.

== Plot ==
Beneath My Mother's Feet is a suspenseful coming-of-age story. Nazia is a fourteen-year-old girl living in modern-day Karachi, Pakistan. She struggles to find herself and fulfill her mother's wishes. After tragedy strikes her family, Nazia is forced to clean houses with her mother. Nazia must step up in order to provide for her family while overcoming the obstacles of growing up and facing the prospect of marriage. She learns how to balance being normal and fulfilling her obligations to her family. After her father suffers an accident at work, rendering the family broke, Nazia must leave school to work as a maid, cleaning the luxurious houses of the wealthy. With an incapacitated father, an opportunist older brother, and two younger siblings, Nazia and her mother struggle to make ends meet. All the while, Nazia faces pressure to have an arranged marriage with her cousin. When her dowry is stolen and she meets a resilient young servant boy, Nazia gains the confidence to take her fate into her own hands.

== Characters ==
=== Main characters ===
- Nazia
- Sherzad
- Amma

=== Secondary characters ===
- Seema
- Abbu
- Bilal
- Mateen
- Isha
- Maleeha
- Saira
- Ms. Haroon

== Reception ==
Kirkus Reviews gave Beneath My Mother's Feet a starred review, describing it as "beautifully written". It was a Junior Library Guild Selection, a Barnes and Noble Discover Great New Writers Pick, a 2010-2011 Choose To Read Selection, and a 2009 Ohioana Book Award winner.
