= Gely Abdel Rahman =

Sudanese poet

- Born: Gely Abdel Rahman; 1931; Sudan
- Origin: Saï, Sudan
- Died: 24 August 1990 (aged 58–59) Egypt
- Occupations: Professor in literary criticism and aesthetics

Gely Abdel Rahman (1931 – 24 August 1990) Arabic: جيلي عبد الرحمن was one of the leading Sudanese poets of the second half of the 20th century.

== Early life ==
Gely Abdel Rahman was born in Saï (island), a small island in the Nile river in northern Sudan. Ethnically from Mahas Skoot, his father migrated to Egypt in the 1920s, where he worked in Royal Palaces as guard in Ansh'as al-Ramel (al-Sharqeia Province). Gely came to Egypt with his mother when he was two years old. He has four sisters and three brothers. He began writing poems when he was 7. When he was nine years old, he learned the whole book of Qur'an by heart, for which he has been awarded a Royal prize. Gely joined al-Azhar school in Cairo, where he completed his primary and secondary education. His life in al-Azhar formed Gely's ideas about oppression and social inequity, when most of al-Azhar students of that time, the 1940s, came from different African countries and resided in unhealthy conditions that led in many cases to students being afflicted by tuberculosis and dying because of that. Gely was arrested when he participated in a student demonstration when he was a student in al-Azhar.

== Career ==
After finishing his secondary education, Gely while studying in Dar al-Ulum, worked as editor in one of the Egyptian newspapers. His work as editor corresponded with Gamal Abdel Nasser taking power in Egypt on 23 July 1952. Gely's first poem was published in 1953 in al-Masry . Gely worked as editor in al-Gumhuriyya (The Republic), and also as an editor in al-Massa, an art newspaper in 1955. Gely joined the Democracy Movement for National Liberation in Egypt in 1951 and continued his activities with the Sudanese Communist Party from that time until he died in 1990.

Gely migrated to the Soviet Union in 1964 to complete his university studies in Moscow. He was granted a scholarship from the African and Asian Writers' Union, and joined the Gorky Institute for Arts in Moscow. Gely received his master's degree in arts in 1969.

After graduation, Gely worked as an editor at Moscow News and then as a lecturer at the Oriental Institute in Moscow. This institute was part of the Soviet Academic Science society. He received a Ph.D. in Comparative Art Theory from the Oriental Institute. He published much of his poetry while in Moscow, including some that was translated in different languages like English, Russian, and French. In 1977 he was invited to Aden University, where he worked as a lecturer in arts and in aesthetics, and was eventually awarded a professorship. Overall, he spent seven years in Yemen. In 1983, Gely moved to Algeria to teach at the Language and Art Institute at Algeria University, where he stayed until afflicted by kidney failure in February 1989. He then moved to Egypt to seek treatment. Gely Abdel Rahman died in August 1990 in Cairo after a surgical operation for a dialysis. He had been married to a Soviet woman named Malakhat Salmanova (Milla) who later died in Switzerland. He had two daughters, Rena and Reem.

== Works ==
=== Poetry ===
- قصائد من السودان [Qasāʾid min al-Sūdān, Poems from Sudan], Cairo, 1956.
- الجواد والسيف المكسور [Al-jawād wa'l-sayf al-maksūr, The Cavalry and the Broken Sword], 1968 (republished in 1985).
- اغاني الزاحفين [Aghānī al-zaḥifīn, Songs of the Marchers]: a poetry book written in collaboration with Najeeb Sarur, Mojahid Abd el-monem and Kamal Amar.
- بوابات المدن الصفراء [Bawābāt al-mudun al-ṣafraʾ, Gates of Yellow Cities]: a poetry book published posthumously by the Egyptian General Corporation for Book.

=== Academia ===
- Gely published a book in political studies under the title المعونات الاجنبية و اثرها على استقلال السودان [Foreign Aid and its Influence on Sudan's Independence]: Gely wrote this book in collaboration with his friend, the poet Taj el-Sir al-Hussan in 1958. This book was introduced by the Sudanese communist leader Abdel Khaliq Mahjub.

=== Translations ===
- Gely translated from Russian to Arabic different Russian poets like Rasoul Gazamotov, Gankez Atanmov, Ayann Kanybaq and others.

=== Unpublished Works ===
- الطير المغبون [Al-tayer al-maghbūn].
- الحريق واحلام البلابل [Al-ḥarīq wa aḥlām al-balābil, The Fire and the Dreams of Nightingales].
