= Lulu Atlantis and the Quest for True Blue Love =

Book by Patricia Martin

- Author: Patricia Martin
- Language: English
- Publisher: Schwartz & Wade Books
- Publication date: January 8, 2008
- Publication place: United States
- Pages: 240
- ISBN: 978-0-375-84016-6
- OCLC: 85443855
- LC Class: PZ7.M364165 Lul 2008

Lulu Atlantis and the Quest for True Blue Love is a 2008 novel by Patricia Martin.

== Plot ==
Lulu Atlantis lives in Sweet Pea Lane. She has a baby brother and a dad that is busy trying to save endangered animals. Lulu tells her troubles to her best friend, a spider named Harry. Harry is a talking spider that offers good advice. The spider says in order for her to find true blue love, she will have to go farther than her backyard. The four stories, that are linked together, makes her realize that she is loved.

== Reception ==
A Publishers Weekly review says, "The scenarios are whimsical; the emotions run true." A Kirkus Reviews review says, "There's enough good old-fashioned curiosity and, quite frankly, weirdness in this early chapter book to overcome its potentially cutesy underpinnings. With descriptive sentences and a penchant for eclectic storytelling, this is an author to watch." Charlotter Decker, of Library Media Connection, reviewed the book saying, "This would be a good read-aloud. Let’s hope for more stories featuring Lulu."
