= Two for the Road =

Two for the Road may refer to:

- Two for the Road (film), a 1967 British comedy drama film
- "Two for the Road" (Lost), a 2006 episode of the American drama television series Lost
- Two for the Road (Herb Ellis and Joe Pass album), 1974
- Two for the Road (Carmen McRae and George Shearing album), 1980
- Two for the Road (Dave Grusin album), 1997
- Two for the Road (Larry Coryell & Steve Khan album), 1977
- "Two for the Road", a song by Bruce Springsteen from the box set Tracks
- "Two for the Road", a 2024 episode of the American television series Only Murders in the Building

== See also ==
- One for the Road (disambiguation)
