= Jane Straus =

Jane Straus (May 18, 1954 – February 25, 2011) was an American writer whose works include The Blue Book of Grammar and Punctuation and Enough is Enough! Born in San Francisco, she studied at the University of California. She was the founder of GrammarBook.com and a "Relationship expert, author, radio host, and media guest."
