= Abraham Brumberg =

American writer and editor

Abraham Brumberg (Hebrew: אברהם ברומברג; November 7, 1926 – January 26, 2008) was an American writer and editor.

He wrote about the Soviet Union, Eastern Europe, and Jewish issues. He was the first editor of Problems of Communism (1952–1970), an author of numerous articles and essays (published in The New York Times, Dissent, The New Republic and other outlets), and the editor of several anthologies. Fluent in Yiddish, he was also an activist for preservation of that language.

Brumberg was born in Tel Aviv and lived in Poland as a child. He escaped capture by the Nazis with his family shortly after Hitler's invasion of Poland in 1939.

== Works ==
- Journeys Through Vanishing Worlds (New Academia, 2007) - memoir
