= Richard Altick =

American literary scholar

Richard Altick

Richard Daniel Altick (September 19, 1915 – February 7, 2008) was an American literary scholar, known for his pioneering contributions to Victorian Studies, as well as for championing both the joys and the rigorous methods of literary research.

== Life ==
Altick was born in Lancaster, Pennsylvania, an area he would later recall in Of a Place and a Time (1991). He graduated from Franklin and Marshall College in 1936 and received a Ph.D. in English from the University of Pennsylvania in 1941 with a dissertation on the 18th-century poet Richard Owen Cambridge.

He returned to Franklin and Marshall in 1941 to teach, but in 1945 joined the English faculty of Ohio State University, where he would remain until his retirement in 1982. Altick's graduate course in bibliography and research methods, English 980, became known for the strenuous demands he made upon his students. Many of the materials developed for that course found their way into The Art of Literary Research, published in 1963. Ohio State would ultimately bestow upon Altick the title of Regents Professor of English, the only member of the English department to be so honored.

Despite infirmities that made writing difficult in his last years, he persisted in reviewing books for such papers as the Times Literary Supplement, maintaining correspondence, and assisting other scholars with their work.

== Works ==
One of Altick's most enduringly popular books was written during his first years at Ohio State: The Scholar Adventurers (1950), a title he coined to describe the literary detectives whose work was resulting in new discoveries about James Boswell, Christopher Marlowe, and other major figures in English literature. When Altick began writing about Victorian Britain in the 1950s, the subject had received scant scholarly attention. But the postwar period saw a revival of interest in the Victorians, as signaled by the founding of the journal Victorian Studies at Indiana University at Bloomington in 1957, a journal to which Altick was an adviser and contributor from that first issue.

Published that same year, his study, The English Common Reader (1957), showcased what his research methods could achieve. It brought together information about what sorts of books, magazines, newspapers, and ephemera ordinary Britons were reading during the first age of industrialized publishing, and presented it in a clear and thoughtful way. In his subsequent books, curiosity led him to explore a wide variety of subjects, most but not all Victorian, ranging from literary biography to the literary contexts of paintings to London panoramas to sensational murders. Among these, the slender book, Victorian People and Ideas (1973), remains one of the best introductions to the period for undergraduates and general readers. The Shows of London (1978), a study of public entertainments from 1600 to 1862, stands out as a major feat of research. Writers, Readers, and Occasions (1989) brought together essays he had published in various journals over the years. The concluding essay in that volume, "'Tis Forty Years Since," offers a retrospective on the evolution of scholarly interest in the Victorians in the twentieth century, from the perspective of a "scholar adventurer" who had played a major role in fostering that interest.

In retirement, Altick continued to indulge what he called his "incurable itch to set pen to paper" with personal reminiscences as well as major books on the literary uses of paintings, the journalistic contexts of Victorian novels, the Victorian origins of "sensational" crime stories, and the first ten years of Punch, the British magazine.

== List of Works ==
- Professor Koeppen: The Adventures of a Danish Scholar in Athens and America (1938) with H. M. J. Klein
- Richard Owen Cambridge, Belated Augustan: A Dissertation in English (1941)
- A Literary History of England: IV The Nineteenth Century and After (1948) with Samuel Chew
- The Cowden Clarkes (1948)
- The Scholar Adventurers (1950)
- The English Common Reader: A Social History of the Mass Reading Public 1800–1900 (1957)
- Guide to Doctoral Dissertations in Victorian Literature 1886-1958 (1960) with William R. Matthews
- A Selective Bibliography for the Study of English and American Literature (1960) with Andrew Wright
- The Art of Literary Research (1963)
- Diction And Style in Writing (1967)
- Browning's Roman Murder Story: A Reading of The Ring & The Book (1968) with James Loucks
- A Preface to Critical Reading (1946)
- Lives and Letters. A History of Literary Biography in England & America (1969)
- To Be in England: An American Literary Man's Personal View (1969)
- Victorian Studies in Scarlet: Murders and Manners in the Age of Victoria (1970)
- Librarianship and the Pursuit of Truth (1972)
- Victorian People And Ideas: A Companion for the Modern Reader of Victorian Literature (1973)
- The Shows of London: A Panoramic History of Exhibitions, 1699–1862 (1978)
- Paintings from Books. Art and Literature in Britain 1760–1900 (1985)
- Deadly Encounters: Two Victorian Sensations (1986) also as Evil Encounters (UK)
- Writers, Readers and Occasions: Selected Essays on Victorian Literature and Life (1989)
- Of a Place and a Time: Remembering Lancaster (1991)
- The Presence of the Present: Topics of the Day in the Victorian Novel (1991)
- Punch: The Lively History of a British Institution 1842–1851 (1997)
- A Little Bit of Luck: The Making of an Adventurous Scholar (2002)
