= A quien corresponda =

2008 novel by Martín Caparrós

- Author: Martín Caparrós
- Language: Spanish
- Published: Editorial Anagrama, Barcelona, 2008
- Publication place: Argentina
- Pages: 319
- ISBN: 978-84-339-7169-2
- OCLC: 257566856
- LC Class: PQ7798.13.A57 A62 2008

A quien corresponda (To Whom it may Concern) is an Argentine novel by Martín Caparrós. It was first published in 2008. The book is a combination of anecdotes, stories, and situations recalled by the protagonist, Carlos "el Gallego" the Galician), in order to remember his partner, who was assassinated by the Argentinian military during the National Reorganization Process.
