= One for the Road (Tørrissen book) =

2008 travel book by Bjørn Christian Tørrissen

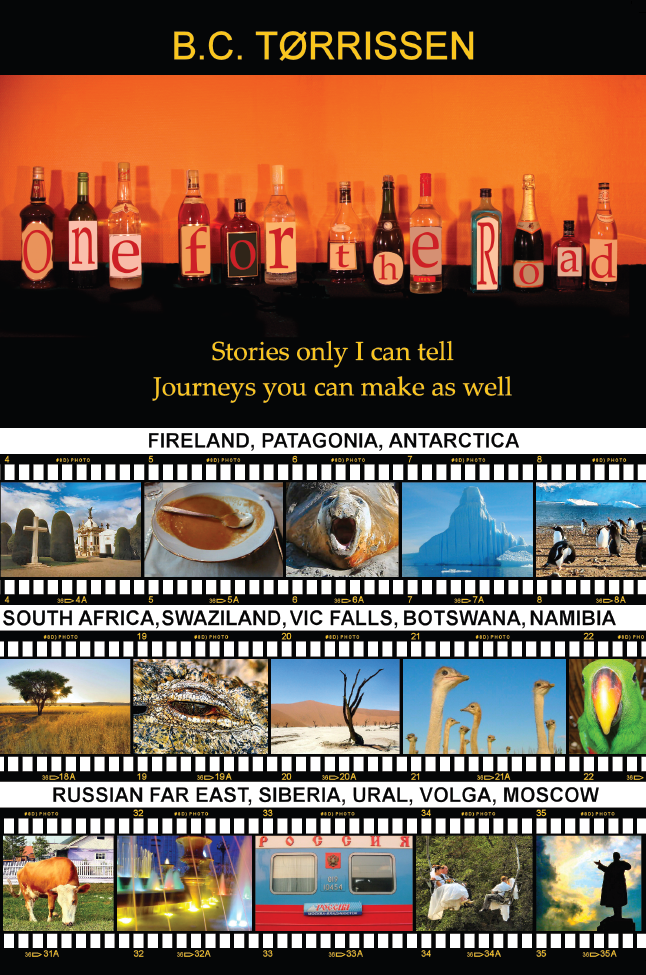
- One for the Road Front cover
- Author: Bjørn Christian Tørrissen
- Language: English
- Genre: Travel literature
- Publisher: Lulu
- Publication date: 2008
- Publication place: Norway
- Media type: Print (Paperback) and eBook
- ISBN: 978-1-84799-453-0

"One For The Road" is a travel book by Bjørn Christian Tørrissen, first published in 2008. The book was translated from Norwegian, where it was published under the title "I pose og sekk!" (2005).

== Summary ==
The book is a non-fiction travel book, narrated in the first person by the independently travelling author. Three different journeys from the period 2001-2003 are described in three main chapters:

The Utterly Deep South

While traveling in Patagonia the author manages to get a discounted "last minute ticket" to a cruise to Antarctica. He has to wait a couple of weeks in South America for the cruise to begin, and spends the time hiking in Torres del Paine National Park in Chile and near El Calafate in Argentina. The main part of the chapter is dedicated to describing what visiting Antarctica is like.

In and Out of Africa

A travelogue from two months of independent travel ("[backpacking]") in Southern Africa. The trip begins and ends in Cape Town, looping through South Africa and its neighbouring countries, most of the time visiting national parks and small towns.

Summer in the Pity

A month of travel on and along the Trans-Siberian Railway, starting in Vladivostok and ending in Moscow, with several stops in between. A part of the distance is done by boat, from Kazan to Nizhny Novgorod on the Volga River.

== Places visited ==
- Chile (Punta Arenas, Puerto Natales, Torres del Paine)
- Argentina (Tierra del Fuego, El Calafate, Ushuaia)
- Antarctica (Drake Passage, Livingston Island, Deception Island, Lemaire Channel, Vernadsky Research Base)
- South Africa (Cape Town, Mossel Bay, Oudtshoorn, Jeffreys Bay, Port Elizabeth, Durban, KwaMbonambi, Saint Lucia, Kruger Park, Pretoria)
- Swaziland (Manzini, Mbabane)
- Botswana (Nata, Maun, Okavango Delta)
- Zimbabwe/Zambia (Victoria Falls)
- Namibia (Windhoek, Sesriem, Luderitz, Fish River Canyon, Keetmanshoop)
- Russia (Vladivostok, Khabarovsk, Irkutsk, Lake Baikal, Krasnoyarsk, Yekaterinburg, Kazan, Nizhny Novgorod, Moscow)

== License/reuse of contents ==
The book is licensed under the Creative Commons "Attribution-Noncommercial-No Derivative Works 2.0 Generic" license and can be freely downloaded from the book's official Web site. The author encourages reuse of both the text and photographs from the book.
