= The New York Times Book Review =

Weekly review of books by The New York Times

- The cover of the June 13, 2004 New York Times Book Review
- Editor: Gilbert Cruz
- Frequency: Weekly
- First issue: October 10, 1896
- Company: The New York Times Company
- Country: United States
- Based in: New York City, U.S.
- Language: English
- Website: nytimes.com
- ISSN: 0028-7806

The New York Times Book Review (NYTBR) is a weekly paper-magazine supplement to the Sunday edition of The New York Times in which current non-fiction and fiction books are reviewed. It is one of the most influential and widely read book review publications in the industry. The magazine's offices are located near Times Square in New York City.

== Overview ==
The New York Times has published a book review section since Saturday, October 10, 1896, announcing: "We begin today the publication of a Supplement which contains reviews of new books ... and other interesting matter ... associated with news of the day." In 1911, the review was moved to Sundays, on the theory that it would be more appreciatively received by readers with a bit of time on their hands.

The target audience is an intelligent, general-interest adult reader. The Times publishes two versions each week, one with a cover price sold via subscription, bookstores, and newsstands; the other with no cover price included as an insert in each Sunday edition of the Times (the copies are otherwise identical).

Each week, the NYTBR receives 750 to 1000 books from authors and publishers in the mail, of which 20 to 30 are chosen for review. Books are selected by the "preview editors" who read over 1,500 advance galleys a year. The selection process is based on finding books that are important and notable, as well as discovering new authors whose books stand above the crowd. Self-published books are generally not reviewed as a matter of policy. Books not selected for review are stored in a "discard room" and then sold. As of 2006, Barnes & Noble arrived about once a month to purchase the contents of the discard room, and the proceeds are then donated by NYTBR to charities. Books that are actually reviewed are usually donated to the reviewer.

As of 2015, all review critics are freelance; the NYTBR does not have staff critics. In prior years, the NYTBR did have in-house critics, or a mix of in-house and freelance. For freelance critics, they are assigned an in-house "preview editor" who works with them in creating the final review. Freelance critics might be employees of The New York Times whose main duties are in other departments. They also include professional literary critics, novelists, academics, and artists who write reviews for the NYTBR on a regular basis.

Other duties on staff include a number of senior editors and a chief editor; a team of copy editors; a letter pages editor who reads letters to the editor; columnists who write weekly columns, such as the "Paperback Row" column; a production editor; a web and Internet publishing division; and other jobs. In addition to the magazine there is an Internet site that offers additional content, including audio interviews with authors, called the "Book Review Podcast".

The book review publishes each week the widely cited and influential New York Times Best Seller list, which is created by the editors of the Times "News Surveys" department.

In 2021, on the 125th anniversary of the Book Review, Parul Sehgal a staff critic and former editor at the Book Review, wrote a review of the NYTBR titled "Reviewing the Book Review".

"Inside The New York Times Book Review" is the oldest and most popular podcast at The New York Times. The debut episode was released on April 30, 2006 and the show has been recorded weekly ever since.

== Editors ==
The Editor of The New York Times Book Review directs the publication's editorial strategy and manages a staff responsible for selecting which newly published books will receive coverage. The Editor also oversees the assignment of these titles to book reviewers such as professional critics, authors and journalists. There might be a Deputy Editor or Assistant Editor who help the Editor.

- 1896–1902: Francis Whiting Halsey
- 1902–1907: Edward A. Dithmar
- 1907–1913: Transitional period (During this window, the section was overseen by Sunday staff and short-term editors, including Joseph Benson Gilder and William Bayard Hale)
- 1913–1922: Clifford Smyth
- 1922–1925: Brooks Atkinson
- 1925–1943: J. Donald Adams
- 1943–1946: Robert van Gelder
- 1946–1948: John K. Hutchens (Assistant Editor 1944–1946)
- 1948–1949: Hilary Herbert Lyons, Jr. (Acting Editor)
- 1949–1971: Francis Brown
- 1971–1975: John Leonard
- 1975–1983: Harvey Shapiro
- 1983–1989: Mitchel Levitas
- 1989–1995: Rebecca Pepper Sinkler (Deputy Editor 1984–1989; first female Editor)
- 1995–2004: Charles McGrath
- 2004–2013: Sam Tanenhaus
- 2013–2022: Pamela Paul
- 2022–present: Gilbert Cruz

=== Children's Books ===
There have been eight Children's Book Editors since the position was created in 1935.

- 1935–1946: Anne Thaxter Eaton (Co-editor with Buell)
- 1935–1963: Ellen Lewis Buell (Co-editor until 1946; sole editor 1946–1963)
- 1963–1984: George A. Woods
- 1984–2005: Eden Ross Lipson
- 2005–2010: Julie Just (daughter of Ward Just)
- 2011–2013: Pamela Paul
- 2013–2014: Sarah Harrison Smith
- 2014–2020: Maria Russo
- 2020–present: Jennifer Krauss

== 1983 Legion court case ==
In 1983, William Peter Blatty sued the New York Times Book Review for failing to include his 1983 novel, Legion, in its best-seller list. The New York Times had previously claimed that it based its "best-seller list" on computer-processed sales figures from 2,000 bookstores across the United States. Blatty contended that Legion had sold enough copies to be included on the list. Lawyers for The New York Times did not deny this, but stated that the content of its best-seller list is a subjectively editorial compilation. The court ruled in favor of The New York Times, relying on the First Amendment precedent of Miami Herald Publishing Co. v. Tornillo (1974).

== Best Books of the Year and Notable Books ==
Each year since 1968, around the beginning of December, a list of notable books and/or editor's choice ("Best Books") is announced. Beginning in 2004, it consists of a "100 Notable Books of the Year" list which contains fiction and non-fiction titles, 50 of each. From the list of 100, 10 books are awarded the "Best Books of the Year" title, five each of fiction and non-fiction. Other year-end lists include the Best Illustrated Children's Books, in which 10 books are chosen by a panel of judges.

=== 1990s ===
1998

The Notable Books were announced December 6, 1998. The eleven Editor's Choice books were announced December 6, 1998.

- Lorrie Moore, Birds of America
- Russell Banks, Cloudsplitter
- Richard Fortey, Life: A Natural History of the First Four Billion Years of Life on Earth
- Alice Munro, The Love of a Good Woman
- Barbara Kingsolver, The Poisonwood Bible
- David Gates, Preston Falls
- Ron Chernow, Titan: The Life of John D. Rockefeller, Sr.
- Richard Holbrooke, To End a War
- Hilary Spurling, The Unknown Matisse
- Graham Robb, Victor Hugo: A Biography
- Philip Gourevitch, We Wish to Inform You That Tomorrow We Will be Killed With Our Families: Stories from Rwanda

1999

The Notable Books were announced December 5, 1999. The eleven Editor's Choice books were announced December 5, 1999.

- Richard A. Posner, An Affair of State: The Investigation, Impeachment, and Trial of President Clinton
- Annie Proulx, Close Range: Wyoming Stories
- Richard Holmes, Coleridge: Darker Reflections, 1804-1834
- J. M. Coetzee, Disgrace
- Antonio Damasio, The Feeling of What Happens: Body and Emotion in the Making of Consciousness
- John Keegan, The First World War
- Michael Frayn, Headlong
- Jean Strouse, Morgan: American Financier
- Inga Clendinnen, Reading the Holocaust
- Judith Thurman, Secrets of the Flesh: A Life of Colette
- Roddy Doyle, A Star Called Henry

=== 2000s ===
2000

The Notable Books were announced December 3, 2000. The 10 Editor's Choice books were announced December 3, 2000.

- Jim Crace, Being Dead
- Beowulf translation by Seamus Heaney
- Matt Ridley, Genome: The Autobiography of a Species in 23 Chapters
- John Updike, Gertrude and Claudius
- Dave Eggers, A Heartbreaking Work Of Staggering Genius: A Memoir Based on a True Story
- Philip Roth, The Human Stain
- Tom Segev, One Palestine, Complete: Jews and Arabs Under the British Mandate
- Graham Robb, Rimbaud: A Biography
- Frances FitzGerald, Way Out There In the Blue: Reagan, Star Wars and the End of the Cold War
- Zadie Smith, White Teeth

2001

The Notable Books were announced December 2, 2001. The 9 Editor's Choice books were announced December 2, 2001.

- W.G. Sebald, Austerlitz
- Paula Fox, Borrowed Finery: A Memoir
- Jonathan Franzen, The Corrections
- Alice Munro, Hateship, Friendship, Courtship, Loveship, Marriage
- David McCullough, John Adams
- Colson Whitehead, John Henry Days
- Louis Menand, The Metaphysical Club: A Story of Ideas in America
- Peter Carey, True History of the Kelly Gang
- Oliver Sacks, Uncle Tungsten: Memories of a Chemical Boyhood

2002

The Notable Books were announced December 8, 2002. The 7 Editor's Choice books were announced December 8, 2002.

- Miranda Carter, Anthony Blunt: His Lives
- Ian McEwan, Atonement
- Lorna Sage, Bad Blood
- Jeffrey Eugenides, Middlesex
- Margaret MacMillan, Paris 1919: Six Months That Changed the World
- William Kennedy, Roscoe
- Timothy Ferris, Seeing in the Dark: How Backyard Stargazers Are Probing Deep Space and Guarding Earth from Interplanetary Peril

2003

The Notable Books were announced December 7, 2003. The 9 Editor's Choice books were announced December 7, 2003.

- Caroline Alexander, The Bounty: The True Story of the Mutiny on the Bounty
- Monica Ali, Brick Lane
- T. Coraghessan Boyle, Drop City
- Jonathan Lethem, The Fortress of Solitude
- William Taubman, Khrushchev: The Man and His Era
- Edward P. Jones, The Known World
- Gabriel García Márquez, Living to Tell the Tale
- Adrian Nicole LeBlanc, Random Family: Love, Drugs, Trouble, and Coming of Age in the Bronx
- Claire Tomalin, Samuel Pepys: The Unequalled Self

2004

The 100 Notable Books were announced December 5, 2004. The 10 Best Books were announced December 12, 2004.

- Ron Chernow, Alexander Hamilton
- Bob Dylan, Chronicles: Volume One
- David Hackett Fischer, Washington's Crossing
- Stephen Greenblatt, Will in the World: How Shakespeare Became Shakespeare
- Ha Jin, War Trash
- Alice Munro, Runaway
- Orhan Pamuk, Snow
- Marilynne Robinson, Gilead
- Philip Roth, The Plot Against America
- Colm Tóibín, The Master

2005

The 100 Notable Books were announced December 4, 2005. The 10 Best Books were announced December 11, 2005.

- Joan Didion, The Year of Magical Thinking
- Mary Gaitskill, Veronica
- Jonathan Harr, The Lost Painting: The Quest for a Caravaggio Masterpiece
- Tony Judt, Postwar: A History of Europe Since 1945
- Ian McEwan, Saturday
- Haruki Murakami, Kafka on the Shore
- George Packer, The Assassins' Gate: America in Iraq
- Curtis Sittenfeld, Prep
- Zadie Smith, On Beauty
- Mark Stevens and Annalyn Swan, de Kooning: An American Master

2006

The 100 Notable Books were announced December 3, 2006. The 10 Best Books were announced December 10, 2006.

- Richard Ford, The Lay of the Land
- Amy Hempel, The Collected Stories of Amy Hempel
- Claire Messud, The Emperor's Children
- Marisha Pessl, Special Topics in Calamity Physics
- Nathaniel Philbrick, Mayflower: A Story of Courage, Community, and War
- Michael Pollan, The Omnivore's Dilemma: A Natural History of Four Meals
- Gary Shteyngart, Absurdistan
- Rory Stewart, The Places In Between
- Danielle Trussoni, Falling Through the Earth: A Memoir
- Lawrence Wright, The Looming Tower: Al-Qaeda and the Road to 9/11

2007

The 100 Notable Books were announced December 2, 2007. The 10 Best Books were announced December 9, 2007.

- Roberto Bolaño, The Savage Detectives
- Rajiv Chandrasekaran, Imperial Life in the Emerald City: Inside Iraq's Green Zone
- Linda Colley, The Ordeal of Elizabeth Marsh: A Woman in World History
- Joshua Ferris, Then We Came to the End
- Denis Johnson, Tree of Smoke: A Novel
- Mildred Armstrong Kalish, Little Heathens
- Per Petterson, Out Stealing Horses
- Alex Ross, The Rest Is Noise: Listening to the Twentieth Century
- Michael Thomas, Man Gone Down: A Novel
- Jeffrey Toobin, The Nine: Inside the Secret World of the Supreme Court

2008

The 100 Notable Books were announced November 26, 2008. The 10 Best Books were announced December 14, 2008.

- Julian Barnes, Nothing to Be Frightened Of
- Roberto Bolaño, 2666
- Drew Gilpin Faust, This Republic of Suffering: Death and the American Civil War
- Dexter Filkins, The Forever War
- Patrick French, The World Is What It Is: The Authorized Biography of V. S. Naipaul
- Jhumpa Lahiri, Unaccustomed Earth
- Jane Mayer, The Dark Side: The Inside Story of How The War on Terror Turned into a War on American Ideals
- Steven Millhauser, Dangerous Laughter: 13 Stories
- Toni Morrison, A Mercy
- Joseph O'Neill, Netherland

2009

The 100 Notable Books were announced December 6, 2009. The 10 Best Books were announced December 13, 2009.

- Liaquat Ahamed, Lords of Finance: The Bankers Who Broke the World
- David Finkel, The Good Soldiers
- Richard Holmes, The Age of Wonder: How the Romantic Generation Discovered the Beauty and Terror of Science
- Mary Karr, Lit: A Memoir
- Jonathan Lethem, Chronic City
- Maile Meloy, Both Ways Is the Only Way I Want It
- Lorrie Moore, A Gate at the Stairs
- Carol Sklenicka, Raymond Carver: A Writer's Life
- Kate Walbert, A Short History of Women
- Jeannette Walls, Half Broke Horses

=== 2010s ===
2010

The 100 Notable Books were announced November 24, 2010. The 10 Best Books were announced December 1, 2010.

- Ann Beattie, The New Yorker Stories
- Emma Donoghue, Room
- Jennifer Egan, A Visit from the Goon Squad
- Jonathan Franzen, Freedom
- Jennifer Homans, Apollo's Angels: A History of Ballet
- Siddhartha Mukherjee, The Emperor of All Maladies: A Biography of Cancer
- Stacy Schiff, Cleopatra: A Life
- Stephen Sondheim, Finishing the Hat
- William Trevor, Selected Stories
- Isabel Wilkerson, The Warmth of Other Suns: The Epic Story of America's Great Migration

2011

The 100 Notable Books were announced November 21, 2011. The 10 Best Books were announced November 30, 2011.

- Ian Brown, The Boy in the Moon: A Father's Journey to Understand His Extraordinary Son
- Amanda Foreman, A World on Fire: Britain's Crucial Role in the American Civil War
- Chad Harbach, The Art of Fielding
- Eleanor Henderson, Ten Thousand Saints
- Christopher Hitchens, Arguably: Essays
- Daniel Kahneman, Thinking, Fast and Slow
- Stephen King, 11/22/63
- Manning Marable, Malcolm X: A Life of Reinvention
- Téa Obreht, The Tiger's Wife
- Karen Russell, Swamplandia!

2012

The 100 Notable Books were announced November 27, 2012. The 10 Best Books were announced November 30, 2012.

- Katherine Boo, Behind the Beautiful Forevers: Life, Death, and Hope in a Mumbai Undercity
- Robert Caro, The Passage of Power
- Dave Eggers, A Hologram for the King
- Jim Holt, Why Does the World Exist?: An Existential Detective Story
- Hilary Mantel, Bring Up the Bodies
- David Nasaw, The Patriarch: The Remarkable Life and Turbulent Times of Joseph P. Kennedy
- Kevin Powers, The Yellow Birds
- Andrew Solomon, Far From the Tree: Parents, Children and the Search for Identity
- Zadie Smith, NW
- Chris Ware, Building Stories

2013

The 100 Notable Books were announced November 27, 2013. The 10 Best Books were announced December 4, 2013.

- Chimamanda Ngozi Adichie, Americanah
- Kate Atkinson, Life After Life
- Peter Baker, Days of Fire: Bush and Cheney in the White House
- Alan S. Blinder, After the Music Stopped: The Financial Crisis, the Response, and the Work Ahead
- Christopher Clark, The Sleepwalkers: How Europe Went to War in 1914
- Sonali Deraniyagala, Wave: Life and Memories after the Tsunami
- Sheri Fink, Five Days at Memorial: Life and Death in a Storm-Ravaged Hospital
- Rachel Kushner, The Flamethrowers
- Donna Tartt, The Goldfinch
- George Saunders, Tenth of December: Stories

2014

The 100 Notable Books were announced. The 10 Best Books were announced December 14, 2014.

- Eula Biss, On Immunity: An Inoculation
- Roz Chast, Can't We Talk about Something More Pleasant?: A Memoir
- Anthony Doerr, All the Light We Cannot See
- Lily King, Euphoria
- Phil Klay, Redeployment
- Elizabeth Kolbert, The Sixth Extinction: An Unnatural History
- Hermione Lee, Penelope Fitzgerald: A Life
- Jenny Offill, Dept. of Speculation
- Akhil Sharma, Family Life
- Lawrence Wright, Thirteen Days in September: Carter, Begin, and Sadat at Camp

2015

The 100 Notable Books were announced November 27, 2015. The 10 Best Books were announced December 3, 2015.

- Paul Beatty, The Sellout
- Sven Beckert, Empire of Cotton: A Global History
- Lucia Berlin, A Manual for Cleaning Women: Selected Stories
- Ta-Nehisi Coates, Between the World and Me
- Rachel Cusk, Outline
- Elena Ferrante, The Story of the Lost Child: Book 4, The Neapolitan Novels: "Maturity, Old Age"
- Helen Macdonald, H Is for Hawk
- Åsne Seierstad, One of Us: The Story of Anders Breivik and the Massacre in Norway
- Magda Szabó, The Door
- Andrea Wulf, The Invention of Nature: Alexander von Humboldt's New World

2016

The 100 Notable Books were announced November 23, 2016. The 10 Best Books were announced December 1, 2016.

- Sarah Bakewell, At the Existentialist Café: Freedom, Being, and Apricot Cocktails
- Matthew Desmond, Evicted: Poverty and Profit in the American City
- Susan Faludi, In the Darkroom
- Stefan Hertmans, War and Turpentine
- Han Kang, The Vegetarian
- Karan Mahajan, The Association of Small Bombs
- Hisham Matar, The Return: Fathers, Sons and the Land in Between
- Jane Mayer, Dark Money: The Hidden History of the Billionaires Behind the Rise of the Radical Right
- Ian McGuire, The North Water
- Colson Whitehead, The Underground Railroad

2017

The 100 Notable Books were announced November 22, 2017. The 10 Best Books were announced November 30, 2017.

- Naomi Alderman, The Power
- Ron Chernow, Grant
- James Forman Jr., Locking Up Our Own: Crime and Punishment in Black America
- Caroline Fraser, Prairie Fires: The American Dreams of Laura Ingalls Wilder
- Mohsin Hamid, Exit West
- Min Jin Lee, Pachinko
- Patricia Lockwood, Priestdaddy: A Memoir
- Richard Prum, The Evolution of Beauty: How Darwin's Forgotten Theory of Mate Choice Shapes the Animal World — and Us
- Ali Smith, Autumn
- Jesmyn Ward, Sing, Unburied, Sing

2018

The 100 Notable Books were announced November 18, 2018. The 10 Best Books were announced November 29, 2018.

- Shane Bauer, American Prison: A Reporter's Undercover Journey into the Business of Punishment
- Lisa Brennan-Jobs, Small Fry
- David W. Blight, Frederick Douglass: Prophet of Freedom
- Esi Edugyan, Washington Black
- Lisa Halliday, Asymmetry
- Rebecca Makkai, The Great Believers
- Tommy Orange, There There
- Michael Pollan, How to Change Your Mind: What the New Science of Psychedelics Teaches Us About Consciousness, Dying, Addiction, Depression, and Transcendence
- Leïla Slimani, Lullaby
- Tara Westover, Educated

2019

The 100 Notable Books were announced November 25, 2019. The 10 Best Books were announced November 22, 2019. In 2019 for the first time, the 10 Best Books were announced prior to the 100 Notable Books.

- Kevin Barry, Night Boat to Tangier
- Sarah M. Broom, The Yellow House
- Leo Damrosch, The Club: Johnson, Boswell, and the Friends Who Shaped an Age
- Ted Chiang, Exhalation: Stories
- Adam Higginbotham, Midnight in Chernobyl: The Untold Story of the World's Greatest Nuclear Disaster
- Patrick Radden Keefe, Say Nothing: A True Story of Murder and Memory in Northern Ireland
- Ben Lerner, The Topeka School
- Valeria Luiselli, Lost Children Archive
- Julia Phillips, Disappearing Earth
- Rachel Louise Snyder, No Visible Bruises: What We Don't Know About Domestic Violence Can Kill Us

=== 2020s ===
2020

The 100 Notable Books were announced November 20, 2020. The 10 Best Books were announced November 23, 2020.

Fiction

- Lydia Millet, A Children's Bible
- James McBride, Deacon King Kong
- Maggie O'Farrell, Hamnet
- Ayad Akhtar, Homeland Elegies
- Brit Bennett, The Vanishing Half

Nonfiction

- Robert Kolker, Hidden Valley Road
- Barack Obama, A Promised Land
- James Shapiro, Shakespeare in a Divided America
- Anna Wiener, Uncanny Valley
- Margaret MacMillan, War: How Conflict Shaped Us

2021

The 100 Notable Books were announced November 22, 2021. The 10 Best Books were announced November 30, 2021.

Fiction

- Imbolo Mbue, How Beautiful We Were
- Katie Kitamura, Intimacies
- Honorée Fanonne Jeffers, The Love Songs of W.E.B. Du Bois
- Patricia Lockwood, No One Is Talking About This
- Benjamín Labatut, When We Cease to Understand the World

Nonfiction

- Tove Ditlevsen, The Copenhagen Trilogy
- Clint Smith, How the Word Is Passed
- Andrea Elliott, Invisible Child: Poverty, Survival and Hope in an American City
- Annette Gordon-Reed, On Juneteenth
- Heather Clark, Red Comet: The Short Life and Blazing Art of Sylvia Plath

2022

The 100 Notable Books were announced November 22, 2022. The 10 Best Books were announced November 29, 2022.

Fiction

- Jennifer Egan, The Candy House
- Claire-Louise Bennett, Checkout 19
- Barbara Kingsolver, Demon Copperhead
- Namwali Serpell, The Furrows
- Hernan Diaz, Trust

Nonfiction

- Ed Yong, An Immense World: How Animal Senses Reveal the Hidden Realms Around Us
- Hua Hsu, Stay True: A Memoir
- Rachel Aviv, Strangers to Ourselves: Unsettled Minds and the Stories That Make Us
- Linda Villarosa, Under the Skin: The Hidden Toll of Racism on American Lives and on the Health of Our Nation
- Fintan O'Toole, We Don't Know Ourselves: a Personal History of Modern Ireland

2023

The 100 Notable Books were announced November 21, 2023. The 10 Best Books were announced on November 28.

Fiction

- Paul Murray, The Bee Sting
- Nana Kwame Adjei-Brenyah, Chain-Gang All-Stars
- Maylis de Kerangal, Eastbound
- Zadie Smith, The Fraud
- Daniel Mason, North Woods

Nonfiction

- Jonathan Rosen, The Best Minds: A Story of Friendship, Madness, and the Tragedy of Good Intentions
- Kerry Howley, Bottoms Up and the Devil Laughs
- John Vaillant, Fire Weather: A True Story From a Hotter World
- Ilyon Woo, Master Slave Husband Wife
- Patricia Evangelista, Some People Need Killing

2024

The 100 Notable Books were announced November 26, 2024. The 10 Best Books were announced on December 3.

Fiction

- Miranda July, All Fours
- Dolly Alderton, Good Material
- Percival Everett, James
- Kaveh Akbar, Martyr!
- Álvaro Enrigue, You Dreamed of Empires

Nonfiction

- József Debreczeni, Cold Crematorium: Reporting from the Land of Auschwitz
- Jonathan Blitzer, Everyone Who Is Gone Is Here: The United States, Central America, and the Making of a Crisis
- Lucy Sante, I Heard Her Call My Name: A Memoir of Transition
- Max Boot, Reagan: His Life and Legend
- Hampton Sides, The Wide Wide Sea: Imperial Ambition, First Contact and the Fateful Final Voyage of Captain James Cook

2025

The 100 Notable Books were announced November 24, 2025. The 10 Best Books were announced on December 2.

Fiction

- Daniel Kraus, Angel Down
- Daniel Kehlmann, The Director
- Kiran Desai, The Loneliness of Sonia and Sunny
- Jonas Hassen Khemiri, The Sisters
- Charlotte Wood, Stone Yard Devotional

Nonfiction

- Sophie Elmhirst, A Marriage at Sea
- Kevin Sack, Mother Emanuel: Two Centuries of Race, Resistance, and Forgiveness in One Charleston Church
- Arundhati Roy, Mother Mary Comes to Me
- Brian Goldstone, There Is No Place for Us: Working and Homeless in America
- Sue Prideaux, Wild Thing: A Life of Paul Gauguin

== Studies ==
In 2010, Stanford professors Alan Sorenson and Jonah Berger published a study examining the effect on book sales from positive or negative reviews in the New York Times Book Review. They found all books benefited from positive reviews, while only popular or well-known authors were negatively impacted by negative reviews. Lesser-known authors benefited from negative reviews (i.e., bad publicity boosted book sales).

A 2012 study by writer Roxane Gay found that 90% of New York Times book reviews published in 2011 were on books by white authors, whereas 2010 United States census found that only 72% of the population was White, defined as including Hispanic and Latino Americans who identify as white.

== See also ==
- Books in the United States
