= Washington: A Life =

Book by Ron Chernow

- Author: Ron Chernow
- Language: English
- Subject: George Washington
- Genre: Non-fiction; biography
- Publisher: Penguin Press
- Publication date: October 5, 2010
- Publication place: United States
- Media type: Print, digital, audio
- Pages: 904 (hardcover)
- ISBN: 978-1-59420-266-7
- Dewey Decimal: 973.4/1092 B
- LC Class: E312.C495 2010

Washington: A Life is a biography of George Washington, the first president of the United States, written by American historian and biographer Ron Chernow and published in 2010. The book is a "one-volume, cradle-to-grave narrative" that attempts to provide a fresh portrait of Washington as "real, credible, and charismatic in the same way he was perceived by his contemporaries".

Chernow, a former business journalist, was inspired to write the book while researching another biography on Washington's long-time aide Alexander Hamilton. Washington: A Life took six years to complete and makes extensive use of archival evidence. The book was released to wide acclaim from critics, several of whom called it the best biography of Washington ever written. In 2011, the book won the Pulitzer Prize for Biography or Autobiography, as well as the New-York Historical Society's American History Book Prize.

== Background ==
The book's author, Ron Chernow, is a former freelance business journalist who later fashioned himself as a "self-made historian". His 1990 history of financier J. P. Morgan's family, The House of Morgan, won the National Book Award for Nonfiction. In 2004, he published a biography of American Founding Father Alexander Hamilton, for which he won the inaugural $50,000 George Washington Book Prize.

Chernow conceived the idea of a book on Washington while researching Hamilton's life; the two men had worked together closely, and Chernow had come to believe that "Hamilton is the protagonist of the book but Washington is the hero of the book". On discovering a letter about a quarrel between Hamilton and Washington, Chernow concluded that there was a more temperamental side to the president than had previously been portrayed. In a later C-SPAN interview, he said that he came to see Washington as "a man of many moods, of many passions, of fiery opinions. But because it was all covered by this immense self-control, people didn't see it." Despite what he estimated to be more than nine hundred books written on Washington, Chernow decided to write another, with the goal of providing a fresh portrait.

In writing the book that would become Washington: A Life, Chernow made extensive use of the archival evidence left by Washington's meticulous record-keeping. These documents included recently discovered written correspondence, maps, and images from the Papers of George Washington, made available by a University of Virginia research project, which began in 1968. Washington: A Life took six years to complete, the first four years of which were spent purely on research. In June 2009, near the end of his work on the book, Chernow slipped on a stair and broke his ankle in three places. He was unable to do anything but read for the following months, and later attributed the injury with allowing him to return to the book with a fresh perspective and improve the manuscript.

== Summary ==
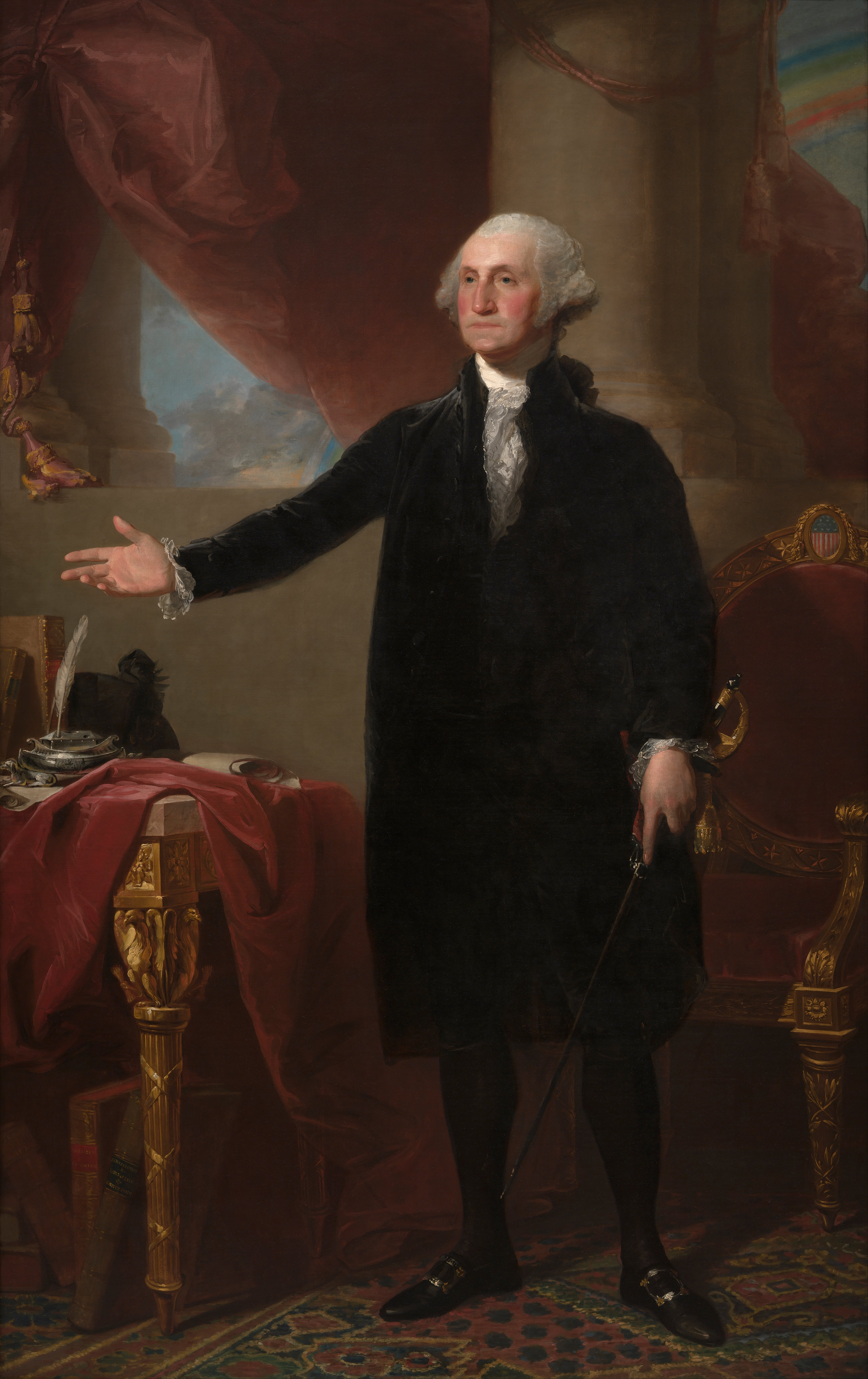
Gilbert Stuart's 1796 portrait of Washington

The prelude of Washington: A Life draws a parallel between Gilbert Stuart's portraits of George Washington and Chernow's attempts to give a fresh portrait of his character in a biography. Stuart, Chernow argues, was not deceived by Washington's "aura of cool command", but painted him as "a sensitive, complex figure, full of pent-up passion"; Chernow states his intention to do the same, presenting Washington as "real, credible, and charismatic in the same way he was perceived by his contemporaries".

Chernow presents Washington as "a man capable of constant self-improvement", rising from a provincial childhood to the presidency of the United States. Beginning with his boyhood, the biography discusses the major events of Washington's life in largely chronological order: his early life and service during the French and Indian War; his career as a planter and his growing dissatisfaction with British rule of the American colonies; his service in the Continental Congress and as commander-in-chief of the Continental Army in the American Revolution; his resignation and brief retirement following the revolution's successful conclusion; his return to public life at the Constitutional Convention; his two terms as the first president of the United States, in which he set a number of important precedents for the office; and the final years of his life. Chernow describes Washington's accomplishments as president as "simply breathtaking":

He had restored American credit and assumed state debt; created a bank, a mint, a coast guard, a customs service, and a diplomatic corps; introduced the first accounting, tax, and budgetary procedures; maintained peace at home and abroad; inaugurated a navy, bolstered the army, and shored up coastal defenses and infrastructure; proved that the country could regulate commerce and negotiate binding treaties; protected frontier settlers, subdued Indian uprisings, and established law and order amid rebellion, scrupulously adhering all the while to the letter of the Constitution ... Most of all he had shown a disbelieving world that republican government could prosper without being spineless or disorderly or reverting to authoritarian rule.

Several chapters also detail Washington's complex feelings about slavery, an institution on which he relied but which he also despised; he left provisions for his slaves to be freed after his death, the only slave-owning founding father to do so. The personal aspects of Washington's life covered by Chernow include the design, creation, and management of Mount Vernon; his leisure activities and hobbies; his difficult relationship with his mother; his personal relationship with the married Sally Cary Fairfax, with whom Washington fell in love just before his marriage to Martha Dandridge Custis; and his relationships with his adopted children, stepchildren, and grandchildren. Chernow also describes the relationships between the childless Washington and a succession of "surrogate sons" such as Alexander Hamilton, the Marquis de Lafayette, and Tobias Lear.

== Critical response ==
In 2011, Washington: A Life won the Pulitzer Prize for Biography, which included a cash prize of $10,000. The three jury members for the biography award were Elizabeth Frank, who won the 1986 Pulitzer Prize for Biography, and historians Arthur L. Herman and Geoffrey Ward. The book was also honored by the New-York Historical Society as the 2011 recipient of the American History Book Prize, which included an award of $50,000 and the title of American Historian Laureate for Chernow.

The book received positive reviews from Andrew Cayton and Janet Maslin of The New York Times. Both felt that Chernow had been able to show an intimate side of Washington that had previously been unrecognized in biographies of the man. Maslin stated that Chernow presented Washington as a "more human and accessible" individual, and Cayton wrote that "[m]ost readers will finish this book feeling as if they have actually spent time with human beings."

Aram Bakshian of The Washington Times and T. J. Stiles of the Washington Post gave opposing reviews of the book. Bakshian felt that Washington: A Life "does full justice to the one truly indispensable man in our nation's history". Stiles was less enthusiastic, stating that while the book offered a purposeful presentation of the life of Washington, he felt that the book was too long. He also criticized Chernow's writing style, which he considered to contain uneven prose and too many cliches.

Simon Sebag Montefiore of The Daily Telegraph and historian W. Ralph Eubanks both commented that Chernow's access to the recently unearthed Papers of George Washington brought a "fresh analysis" and perspective of Washington. Eubanks stated in a review for National Public Radio that "few [books] have given as complete a picture of our first president as Ron Chernow's compelling new biography, Washington: A Life". Gordon S. Wood, recipient of the 1993 Pulitzer Prize for History, wrote in a review for The New York Review of Books that the book was:

[t]he best, most comprehensive, and most balanced single-volume biography of Washington ever written ... One comes away from the book feeling that Washington has finally become comprehensible ... [Chernow's] understanding of human nature is extraordinary and that is what makes his biography so powerful.

Max Byrd, writing for Salon, also called it the "best biography of George Washington yet", concluding, "Chernow's narrative is so rich, its scale so massive and epic, that what is new fits seamlessly into the wider picture .... Chernow has gone into Washington's world, almost into his mind, and inhabited it."
