= Grant (book) =

2017 biography of Ulysses S. Grant by Ron Chernow

- Author: Ron Chernow
- Language: English
- Subject: Ulysses S. Grant
- Genre: Non-fiction; biography
- Publisher: Penguin Press
- Publication date: October 10, 2017
- Publication place: United States
- Media type: Print. Ebook
- Pages: 1,104
- ISBN: 978-1-59420-487-6 (Hardcover)

Grant is a 2017 biography of Ulysses S. Grant, the 18th President of the United States, written by American historian and biographer Ron Chernow. Grant, a Union general during the Civil War, served two terms as president, from 1869 to 1877. Chernow asserts that both Grant's command of the Overland campaign and his presidency have been seen in an undeservedly negative light.

== Background ==
Chernow had previously written about two Founding Fathers, in a biography of Alexander Hamilton (2004) and George Washington (2010). "I had always had a fantasy about doing a big, sweeping saga about the Civil War and Reconstruction," Chernow said. "It fascinates me that there are so many Americans who know about the Civil War battles in intimate detail, but they know nothing about Reconstruction."

The caricature of his presidency was that it was, you know, stained by corruption, and nepotism and cronyism. But to my mind, the big story of his presidency is he's really farsighted in courageous action in terms of protecting ... former slaves who are now full-fledged American citizens.

— Ron Chernow on the historical reputation of Ulysses S. Grant

Proponents of the Lost Cause of the Confederacy, Chernow argues, demonized Grant. His drinking habit, which did not adversely affect his military campaigns, became a central focus of Gilded Age historians. The president was seen poorly for many years, ranked near the bottom among former presidents. Prior to beginning his research for the book, Chernow himself had even bought into the prevailing view; in an earlier biography of John D. Rockefeller, he called Grant "an inept president" and described him as "a small-town businessman before the war, who was enamored of the rich, no matter how frequently they tried to fleece him." On reconsideration, Chernow said, "I think that in the stock market of historical reputations, Grant's stock is definitely rising."

== Critical response ==
The book topped The New York Times Non-Fiction Best Seller list on the weeks of October 29, 2017, and January 7, 2018.

Janet Maslin writes for The New York Times that Grant attempts to change Grant's reputation of being "an inspired commander, an adequate president, a dull companion and a roaring drunk." Maslin adds that the book, "which attempts to see Grant's life as a triumph, is also steeped in tragedy." Albert R. Hunt writes for Bloomberg View, "Chernow definitively establishes that Grant was a great general ... [he] doesn’t gloss over Grant's deficiencies."

Former President Bill Clinton praised the "scholarly and literary strengths" of Chernow's book, as well as how it highlighted the neglected aspects of Grant's presidency, namely protecting the newly freed slaves and their newfound civil rights. For The Washington Post, T. J. Stiles writes, "[Chernow's] research into Grant's struggles with alcohol would be better if he discussed the scale and intensity of the temperance movement ... Chernow's account of Grant's military career, however, works well, particularly in exploring his closest relationships." Stiles further writes that Chernow "makes little use" of novel-writing techniques: "His design does not delight with artful structure". On the other hand, Adam Gopnik, for The New Yorker, writes, "[Chernow]'s talent is suited to Grant's story. He writes the way Grant fought: lacking elegance of means, he covers an immense area of ground, thoroughly and relentlessly, capturing his objectives one by one."

David Blight wrote that "Chernow is one of Grant’s affectionate biographers". Blight noted that Chernow conveys a biographical image of Grant similar to the one Grant himself tried to impose on posterity in his memoirs.

As of 2026, Grant had sold 381,604 copies in hardcover.

== See also ==
- Bibliography of Ulysses S. Grant
