= Lydia Millet =

American novelist (born 1968)

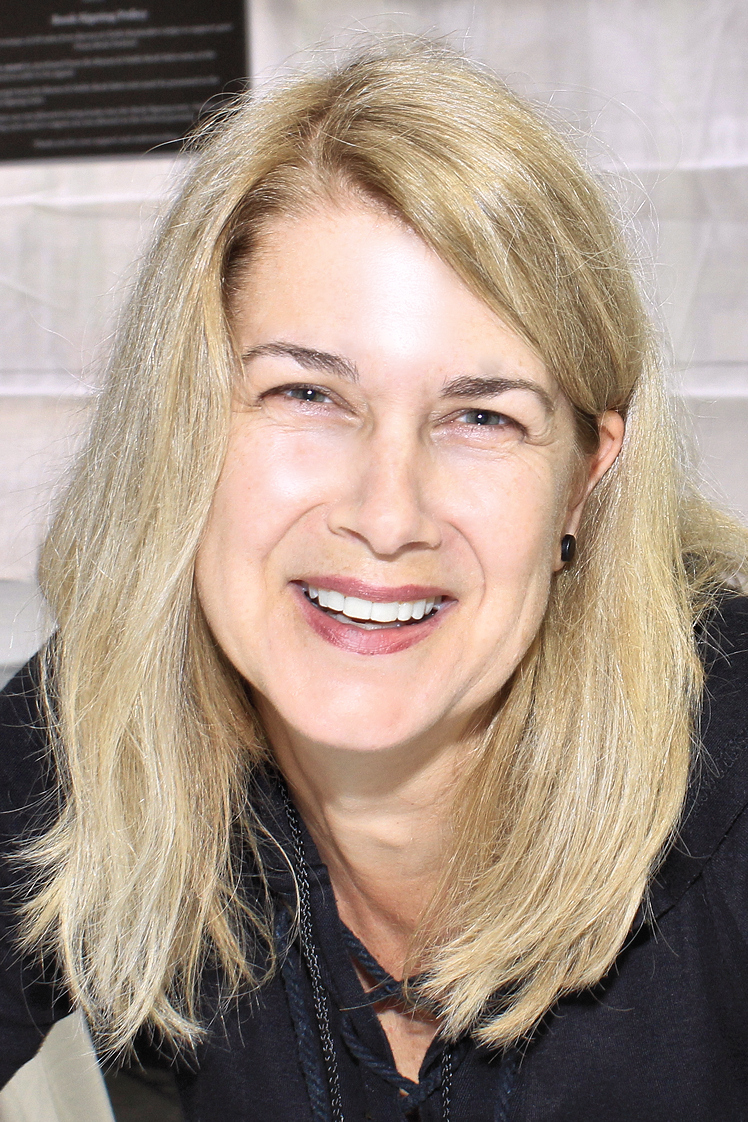
- Millet at the 2016 Texas Book Festival
- Born: December 5, 1968 (age 57); Boston, Massachusetts, U.S.
- Education: University of North Carolina, Chapel Hill (BA); Duke University (MA)
- Occupation: Writer
- Writing career
- Genres: American fiction; Environmental fiction
- Notable works: A Children's Bible (2020); Magnificence: A Novel (2012); Love in Infant Monkeys (2009); My Happy Life (2002)
- Notable awards: Pen Center USA Award; John Simon Guggenheim Memorial Foundation Fellowship; American Academy of Arts and Letters Literature Award
- Website: lydiamillet.net

Lydia Millet (born December 5, 1968) is an American novelist. Her 2020 novel A Children's Bible was a finalist for the National Book Award for Fiction and named one of the ten best books of the year by the New York Times Book Review. She has been a finalist for the Pulitzer Prize and the Los Angeles Times Book Prize. Salon wrote of Millet's work, "The writing is always flawlessly beautiful, reaching for an experience that precedes language itself."

== Biography ==
Millet was born in Boston, Massachusetts and raised in Toronto, Ontario, Canada, where she attended the University of Toronto Schools. She holds a Bachelor of Arts in interdisciplinary studies, with highest honors in creative writing, from the University of North Carolina at Chapel Hill and a master's degree from Duke University. Formerly married to Kieran Suckling, Millet lives in Tucson, Arizona with her two children. She holds a master's in environmental policy from Duke University's Nicholas School of the Environment and worked for Natural Resources Defense Council for two years before joining the Center for Biological Diversity in 1999 as a staff writer.

== Career ==
Millet is best known for her dark sense of humor, stylistic versatility, and political bent. Her first book, Omnivores (1996), is a subversion of the coming-of-age novel, in which a young girl in Southern California is tormented by her megalomaniac father and invalid mother and finally sold in marriage to a real estate agent. Her second, George Bush, Dark Prince of Love (2000), is a political comedy about a trailer-park woman obsessed with the 41st American president.

=== My Happy Life (2002) ===
Brief but weighty, her third book, My Happy Life (2002), is a poetic, language-oriented work about a lonely misfit trapped in an abandoned hospital, who writes the poignant story of her life on the walls. It is narrated by, as The Village Voice glowing deems her, "an orphan cruelly mistreated by life who nevertheless regards her meager subsistence as a radiant gift." Despite the horrors that amount to her life, she still calls herself happy. Jennifer Reese of The New York Times Book Review commented on Millet's new approach to the treatment of the literary victim, saying "Millet has created a truly wretched victim, but where is the outrage? She has coolly avoided injecting so much as a hint of it into this thin, sharp and frequently funny novel; one of the narrator's salient characteristics is an inability to feel even the mildest indignation. The world she inhabits is a savage place, but everything about it interests her, and paying no attention to herself, she is able to see beauty and wonder everywhere."

=== Everyone's Pretty (2005) ===
Millet's fourth novel, Everyone's Pretty (2005), is a picaresque tragicomedy about an alcoholic pornographer with messianic delusions, based partly on Millet's stint as a copy editor at Larry Flynt Publications. Sarah Weinman of the Washington Post Book World called it "both prism and truth" "With a sharp eye for small details, a keen sense of the absurd and strong empathy for its creations," Millet creates a kaleidoscope of quirky characters. The New York Times Book Review called her fifth novel, Oh Pure and Radiant Heart (2005), an "extremely smart…resonant fantasy." It brings three of the physicists responsible for creating the atomic bomb to life in modern-day New Mexico, where they acquire a cult following and embark on a crusade for redemption.

=== How the Dead Dream (2008) ===
How the Dead Dream is "a frightening and gorgeous view of human decline," according to Utne Reader. It features a young Los Angeles real estate developer consumed by power and political ambitions who, after his mother's suicide attempt and two other deaths, begins to nurture a curious obsession with vanishing species. Then a series of calamities forces him from a tropical island, the site on one of his developments, onto the mainland where he takes a Conrad-esque journey up a river into the remote jungle. Eye Weekly summarized this black comedy, noting "American culture loves its stories of hubris, downfall and ruin as of late, but it takes a writer of Millet's sensitivity to enjoy the way down this much."

=== Love in Infant Monkeys (2009) ===
Love in Infant Monkeys is a short story collection featuring vignettes about famous historical and pop culture icons and their encounters with other species.

=== Ghost Lights (2011) ===
Her 2011 novel, Ghost Lights, made best-of-the-year lists in The New York Times and San Francisco Chronicle and received strong critical attention. The novel stars an Internal Revenue Service bureaucrat named Hal — a man baffled by his wife's obsession with her missing employer. In a moment of drunken heroism, Hal embarks on a quest to find the man, embroiling himself in a surreal tropical adventure (and an unexpected affair with a beguiling German woman). Ghost Lights is beautifully written, engaging, and full of insight into the heartbreaking devotion of parenthood and the charismatic oddity of human behavior. The Boston Globe called it "[An] odd and wonderful novel", while the Cleveland Plain Dealer wrote, "Millet is that rare writer of ideas who can turn a ruminative passage into something deeply personal. She can also be wickedly funny, most often at the expense of the unexamined life."

Ghost Lights was the second in an acclaimed cycle of novels that began with How the Dead Dream in 2008. The third, Magnificence (2012) completes the cycle.

=== Magnificence (2012) ===
Magnificence introduced Susan Lindley, a woman adrift after her husband's death and the dissolution of her family. Embarking on a new phase in her life after inheriting her uncle's sprawling mansion and its vast collection of taxidermy, Susan decides to restore the extensive collection of moth-eaten animal mounts, tending to "the fur and feathers, the beaks, the bones and shimmering tails." Meanwhile, an equally derelict human menagerie – including an unfaithful husband and a chorus of eccentric old women – joins her in residence. In a setting both wondrous and absurd, Susan defends her legacy from freeloading relatives and explores the mansion's unknown spaces. Jonathan Lethem, writing for The Guardian, called it "elegant, darkly comic…with overtones variously of Muriel Spark, Edward Gorey and J. G. Ballard, full of contemporary wit and devilish fateful turns for her characters, and then also to knit together into a tapestry of vast implication and ethical urgency, something as large as any writer could attempt: a kind of allegorical elegy for life on a dying planet. Ours, that is." The book was nominated for a Los Angeles Times Book Prize.

=== Shimmers in the Night (2012) ===
The September 2012 release of Shimmers in the Night was the second in The Dissenters, an eco-fantasy series for young adults. Beginning with The Fires Beneath the Sea, the plot follows two young siblings as they search for their mother, a shapeshifting character who is fighting against forces who wants to make the planet over in their own image.

=== Pills and Starships (2014) ===
Pills and Starships is a young adult novel set in "a dystopic future brought by global warming."

=== Mermaids in Paradise (2014) ===
Mermaids in Paradise tempers the sharp satire of Millet's early career with the empathy and subtlety of her more recent novels and short stories. In a send-up of the American honeymoon, "Mermaids in Paradise" takes readers to the grounds of a Caribbean island resort, where newlyweds Deb and Chip — the opinionated, skeptical narrator and her cheerful jock husband — meet a marine biologist who says she's sighted mermaids in a coral reef. Karen Russell wrote "leave it to Lydia Millet to capsize her human characters in aquamarine waters and upstage their honeymoon with mermaids. I am awed to know there's a mind like Millet's out there – she's a writer without limits, always surprising, always hilarious."

=== Sweet Lamb of Heaven (2016) ===
Sweet Lamb of Heaven, published by W. W. Norton & Company in May 2016, blends domestic thriller with psychological horror, following a young mother's flight from her cold and unfaithful husband. As her husband's pursuit escalates to criminal levels, she and her six-year-old daughter go into hiding in a run-down coastal motel where the other guests may have unimaginable secrets of their own. The Los Angeles Times has praised the novel as "a real thriller...part of a higher stakes game being played by Millet, one that will ultimately, unabashedly touch on time, beauty, horror, God, demons and the very nature of being," while The Washington Post called the book "exuberant and playful...featuring a rollicking kidnapping plot and deliciously well-drawn characters."

=== Fight No More (2018) ===
Fight No More: Stories, published in June 2018, was named a best book of the year by Library Journal.

=== A Children's Bible (2020) ===
A Children's Bible, published in May 2020, follows a group of twelve children on a forced vacation with their families at a sprawling lakeside mansion. When a destructive storm descends on the summer estate, the group's ringleaders decide to run away, leading the younger ones on a dangerous foray into the apocalyptic chaos outside. In The Washington Post, critic Ron Charles called the novel, "a blistering little classic."

=== Dinosaurs (2022) ===
Dinosaurs: A Novel, published October 2022, follows a lonely, wealthy heir as he moves from New York City to Phoenix, Arizona after a bad breakup. There, he befriends his next-door neighbors, becoming a confidante to the parents and a friend and trusted babysitter for the two children. He spends his time volunteering at a local women's shelter and wrestling with his breakup and the possibility of future romance in middle age, while also learning about birds that populate the area – which are the descendants of "dinosaurs" referenced by the title.

Publishers Weekly named it one of the top ten books of fiction published in 2022.

== Awards and honors ==
In 2012, Millet received a fellowship from the John Simon Guggenheim Memorial Foundation.

In 2020, The New York Times named A Children's Bible one of the top ten best books of 2020.

In 2022, Publishers Weekly named Dinosaurs one of the top ten books of fiction published in 2022.

Awards for Millet's writing
Year	Title	Award	Category	Result	Ref.
2003	My Happy Life	PEN Center USA Literary Award	Fiction	Won	
2005	Oh Pure and Radiant Heart	Arthur C. Clarke Award	—	Shortlisted	
2009	Love in Infant Monkeys	Salon Book Award	Fiction	Won	
2010	Love in Infant Monkeys	Pulitzer Prize	Fiction	Finalist	
2012	Magnificence	Los Angeles Times Book Prize	Fiction	Finalist	
2012	Magnificence	National Book Critics Circle Award	Fiction	Finalist	
2019	Fight No More	American Academy of Arts and Letters Literature Award	?	Won	
2020	A Children's Bible	National Book Award	Fiction	Shortlisted	
2021	A Children's Bible	Aspen Words Literary Prize	—	Longlisted	
2021	A Children's Bible	James Tait Black Memorial Prize	Fiction	Shortlisted	
2025	Atavists	The Story Prize		Shortlisted	
2026	Atavists	Mark Twain American Voice in Literature Award		Won	

== Bibliography ==
- —— (1996). Omnivores: A Novel. Algonquin Books.
- —— (2000). George Bush, Dark Prince of Love: A Presidential Romance. Touchstone.
- —— (2002). My Happy Life. Henry Holt and Company.
- —— (2005). Oh Pure and Radiant Heart. Soft Skull Press.
- —— (2005). Everyone's Pretty: A Novel. Soft Skull Press.
- —— (2008). How the Dead Dream. Counterpoint.
- —— (2009). Love in Infant Monkeys. Soft Skull Press.
- —— (2011). Ghost Lights: A Novel. W. W. Norton & Company.
- —— (2011). The Fires Beneath the Sea: A Novel. Big Mouth House.
- —— (2012). Magnificence: A Novel. Big Mouth House.
- —— (2012). The Shimmers in the Night: A Novel. W. W. Norton & Company.
- —— (2014). Mermaids in Paradise: A Novel. W. W. Norton & Company.
- —— (2014). Pills and Starships: A Novel. Black Sheep.
- —— (2016). Sweet Lamb of Heaven: A Novel. W. W. Norton & Company.
- —— (2016). The Bodies of the Ancients. Big Mouth House.
- —— (2018). Fight No More: Stories. W. W. Norton & Company.
- —— (2020). A Children's Bible: A Novel. W. W. Norton & Company.
- —— (2022). Dinosaurs: A Novel. W. W. Norton & Company.
- —— (2023). Lyrebird. Picture Books, Gagosian.
- —— (2024). We Loved It All: A Memory of Life. W. W. Norton & Company.
- —— (2025). Atavists: Stories. W. W. Norton & Company.
- —— (2026). Fair Ones: A Double Novel. W. W. Norton & Company.
