= Ron Chernow =

American writer (born 1949)

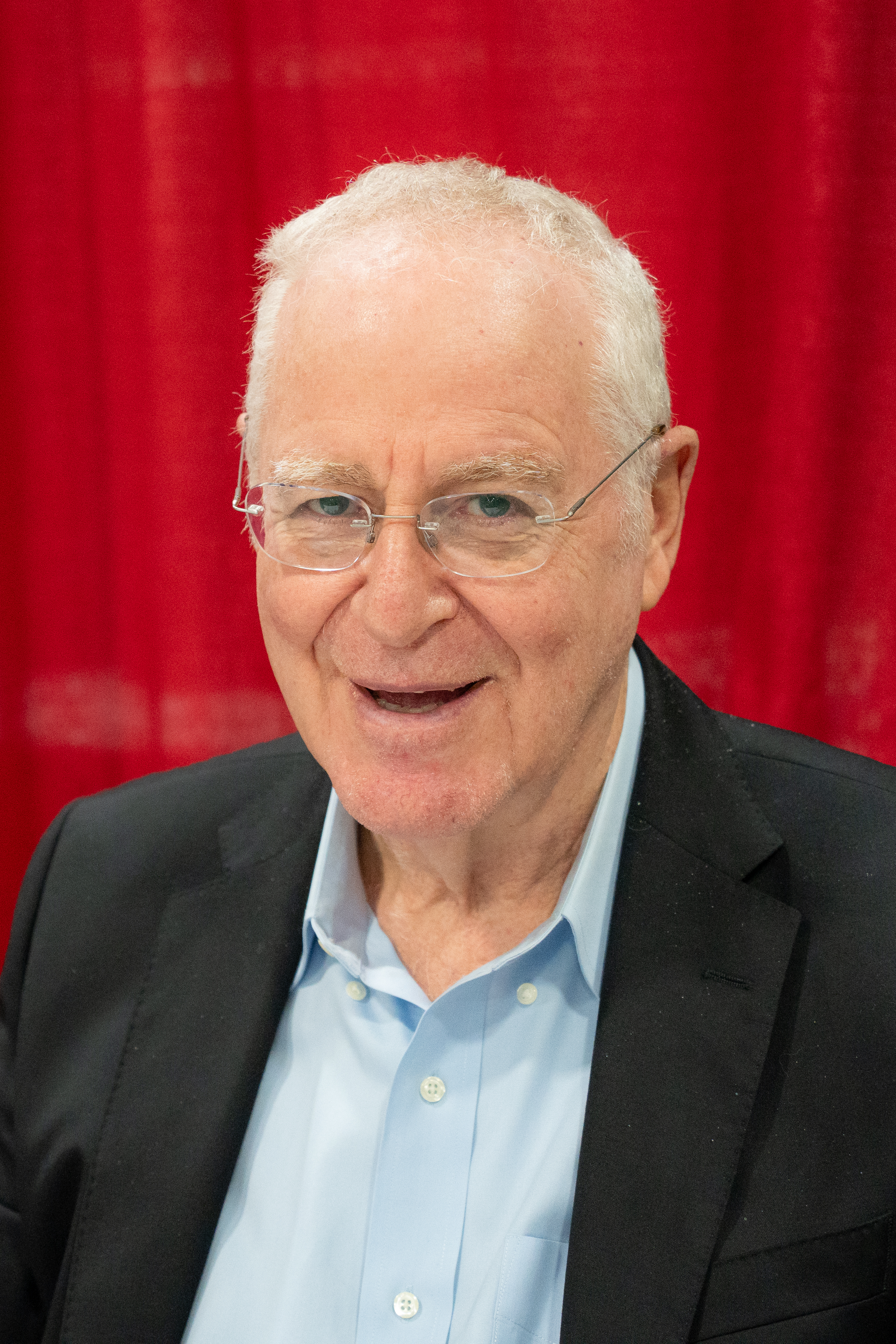
- Chernow at National Book Festival 2025
- Born: Ronald Chernow; March 3, 1949 (age 77); Brooklyn, New York City, U.S.
- Education: Yale University (BA); Pembroke College, Cambridge
- Occupations: Writer; journalist; biographer
- Spouse: Valerie Stearn (m. 1979; died 2006)
- Writing career
- Period: 1973–present
- Subject: Historical biography
- Notable works: Alexander Hamilton; The House of Morgan; Washington: A Life; Grant; Titan: The Life of John D. Rockefeller, Sr.
- Notable awards: Pulitzer Prize for Biography (2011); American History Book Prize (2011); National Book Award for Nonfiction (2010); George Washington Book Prize (2005)

Ronald Chernow (/ˈtʃɜːrnaʊ/; born March 3, 1949) is an American writer, journalist, and biographer. He has written bestselling historical non-fiction biographies.

Chernow won the 2011 Pulitzer Prize for Biography and the 2011 American History Book Prize for his 2010 book Washington: A Life. He is also the recipient of the National Book Award for Nonfiction for his 1990 book The House of Morgan: An American Banking Dynasty and the Rise of Modern Finance. His biographies of Alexander Hamilton (2004) and of John D. Rockefeller (1998) were both nominated for National Book Critics Circle Awards. His biography of Hamilton inspired the popular Hamilton musical, which Chernow worked on as a historical consultant. For another book, The Warburgs: The Twentieth-Century Odyssey of a Remarkable Jewish Family, he was awarded the 1993 George S. Eccles Prize for Excellence in Economic Writing. As a freelance journalist, Chernow has written over sixty articles for various national publications.

== Early life and education ==
Chernow was born on March 3, 1949, in Brooklyn, New York. His father, Israel, was the owner of a discount store and creator of a stock brokerage firm; his mother, Ruth, was a bookkeeper. He is brother to Bart Chernow and uncle to Shandee Chernow. He is of Jewish descent. Chernow was voted "Most Likely to Succeed", and was class president and valedictorian when he graduated in 1966 from Forest Hills High School in Queens in New York City. Chernow graduated summa cum laude from Yale University in 1970 and Pembroke College at Cambridge University with degrees in English literature. He began but did not finish a PhD program. He says that in politics he is a "disgruntled Democrat" and gives his religion as "Jewish, though more in the breach than the observance."

Chernow married Valerie Stearn in 1979; she died in January 2006. Valerie S. Chernow was an assistant professor of languages and social sciences at the New York City College of Technology.

== Career ==
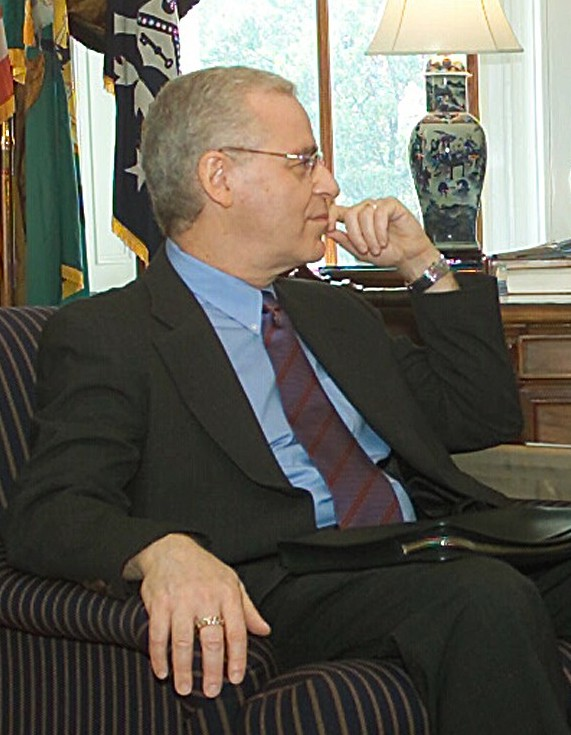
Chernow in 2004

Chernow began his career as a freelance journalist. He wrote more than 60 articles for various national newspapers and magazines from 1973 to 1982. In the mid-1980s, he put his writing pursuits aside when he began serving as the director of financial policy studies with the Twentieth Century Fund in New York City. In 1986, he left the organization and refocused his efforts on writing. In addition to writing nonfiction books and biographies, Chernow contributes articles to The New York Times and The Wall Street Journal. He has also commented on business, politics, and finance on national radio and television shows, and appeared as an expert in documentary films.

=== Business and finance ===
==== The House of Morgan ====
In 1990, Chernow published his first book, The House of Morgan: An American Banking Dynasty and the Rise of Modern Finance, which traces four generations of the J.P. Morgan financial empire. The reviewer for The New York Times Book Review said, "As a portrait of finance, politics and the world of avarice and ambition on Wall Street, the book has the movement and tension of an epic novel. It is, quite simply, a tour de force." The House of Morgan was honored with the National Book Award for Nonfiction.

==== The Warburgs ====
In 1993, Chernow published The Warburgs: The Twentieth-Century Odyssey of a Remarkable Jewish Family, an account of the Warburg family, who immigrated to the U.S. from Germany in 1938. The Warburg family was a prominent financial dynasty of German Jewish descent, known for their accomplishments in physics, classical music, art history, pharmacology, physiology, finance, private equity, and philanthropy. The book was awarded the Columbia Business School's George S. Eccles Prize for Excellence in Economic Writing. It was named as one of the year's ten best works by the American Library Association and a Notable Book by The New York Times.

==== The Death of the Banker ====
In 1997, Chernow published a collection of essays entitled The Death of the Banker: The Decline and Fall of the Great Financial Dynasties and the Triumph of the Small Investor.

==== Titan: The Life of John D. Rockefeller, Sr. ====
External videos
- Booknotes interview with Chernow on Titan, June 21, 1998, C-SPAN
- Presentation by Chernow on Alexander Hamilton, May 26, 2004, C-SPAN
- Washington Journal interview with Chernow on Alexander Hamilton, June 18, 2004, C-SPAN
- Discussion with Chernow on his experiences as consultant on the play Hamilton, February 25, 2016, C-SPAN
- Q&A interview with Chernow on Alexander Hamilton and Hamilton: The Musical, April 24, 2016, C-SPAN
- Part one of Q&A interview with Chernow on Washington: A Life, October 2, 2010, C-SPAN
- Part two of Q&A interview with Chernow on Washington: A Life, October 9, 2010, C-SPAN
- Presentation by Chernow on Washington: A Life, November 21, 2010, C-SPAN
- Q&A interview with Chernow on Grant, November 5, 2017, C-SPAN
- Presentation by Chernow on Grant, September 1, 2018, C-SPAN

In 1998, Chernow published the 774-page Titan: The Life of John D. Rockefeller, Sr., about the industrialist, philanthropist, and founder of the Standard Oil Company. The book reflected Chernow's continued interest in financial history, especially when shaped by compelling and influential individuals. The book remained on The New York Times Best Seller list for 16 weeks, while Time called it "one of the great American biographies". Both publications listed it among the year's ten best books.

=== American politics ===
==== Alexander Hamilton ====
In 2004, Chernow published Alexander Hamilton. The biography was nominated for a National Book Critics Circle Award and was named as the winner of the inaugural George Washington Book Prize for early American history. It remained on The New York Times Best Seller list for three months. In his review for The Journal of American History, Stephen B. Presser, who is professor of business law emeritus at Northwestern University, wrote:

This book is one of those happy rarities: a popular biography that should also delight scholars. ...This is the kind of synthetic narrative history and biography that is rarely done to such high standards and is clearly one of the best introductions to the American formative era available. Moreover, the way Chernow integrates international affairs, domestic politics, economic and constitutional theory, and astute psychological analysis is nothing short of wondrous.

The biography was adapted into a Tony award-winning musical, Hamilton, by Lin-Manuel Miranda, which opened on Broadway in August 2015. Chernow served as historical consultant to the production.

==== George Washington ====
Chernow's 904-page Washington: A Life was released on October 5, 2010. It won the Pulitzer Prize for Biography and the American History Book Prize. Professor Gordon S. Wood, renowned scholar of the Founding era, wrote:

[T]he best, most comprehensive, and most balanced single-volume biography of Washington ever written.... One comes away from the book feeling that Washington has finally become comprehensible.... [Chernow's] understanding of human nature is extraordinary and that is what makes his biography so powerful.

==== Ulysses S. Grant ====
In 2011, Chernow signed a deal to write a comprehensive biography on Ulysses S. Grant. Chernow explained his transition from writing about George Washington to Grant: "Makes some sense as progression. Towering general of Revolution to towering general of Civil War. Both two-term presidents, though with very different results." Grant was released on October 10, 2017, and the biography strongly argues against the conventional wisdom that Grant was an "adequate president, a dull companion and a roaring drunk." The book received overwhelmingly positive reviews and was named by The New York Times as one of the 10 Best Books of 2017.

=== Literary biography ===
==== Mark Twain ====
In 2025, Chernow wrote a full-length biography of Mark Twain released by Penguin Press.

== Dedication to biographical research ==
Chernow is dedicated to deep, comprehensive research in preparing his biographies. "Ron often uses the phrase 'Never underestimate the laziness of your predecessors'," according to Chernow's friend Roger Lowenstein.

== Board memberships ==
In 1990, Chernow became a member of the PEN American Center. In 2006, he was named as the president of the board of trustees, succeeding novelist Salman Rushdie.

== Honors and awards ==
Ron Chernow has received honorary degrees from Long Island University, Marymount Manhattan College, Hamilton College, Washington College, and Skidmore College.

- 1990: National Book Award for Nonfiction for The House of Morgan: An American Banking Dynasty and the Rise of Modern Finance (winner)
- 1993: George S. Eccles Prize for Excellence in Economic Writing for The Warburgs: The Twentieth-Century Odyssey of a Remarkable Jewish Family (winner)
- 1998: National Book Critics Circle Award for Titan: The Life of John D. Rockefeller, Sr. (nominated)
- 2004: George Washington Book Prize for Alexander Hamilton (winner)
- 2004: National Book Critics Circle Award for Alexander Hamilton (nominated)
- 2011: Pulitzer Prize for Biography for Washington: A Life (winner)
- 2011: American History Book Prize for Washington: A Life (winner)
- 2013: BIO Award from Biographers International Organization for advancing the art and craft of biography.
- 2015: National Humanities Medal
- 2016: Benjamin Harrison Presidential Site Advancing American Democracy (winner)
- 2017: Gold Medal Honoree from the National Institute of Social Sciences
- 2017: The Lincoln Forum's Richard Nelson Current Award of Achievement
- 2018: American Academy of Arts and Letters Gold Medal in Biography
- 2019: Golden Plate Award of the American Academy of Achievement
- 2025: National Constitution Center's Liberty Medal for Alexander Hamilton

== Published works ==
=== Books ===
- Chernow, Ron (1990). The House of Morgan: An American Banking Dynasty and the Rise of Modern Finance. Simon & Schuster. ISBN 978-0-671-71031-6.
- Chernow, Ron (1993). The Warburgs: The Twentieth-Century Odyssey of a Remarkable Jewish Family. Random House. ISBN 978-0-67941-823-8.
- Chernow, Ron (1997). The Death of the Banker: The Decline and Fall of the Great Financial Dynasties and the Triumph of the Small Investor. Vintage Books. ISBN 978-0-375-70037-8.
- Chernow, Ron (1998). Titan: The Life of John D. Rockefeller, Sr. Warner. ISBN 978-0-7515-2667-7.
- Chernow, Ron (2005). Alexander Hamilton. Penguin Press. ISBN 978-1-101-20085-8.
- Chernow, Ron (2010). Washington: A Life. Penguin Press. ISBN 978-1-101-44418-4.
- Chernow, Ron (2017). Grant. Penguin Books. ISBN 978-1-59420-487-6.
- Chernow, Ron (2025). Mark Twain. Penguin Books. ISBN 978-0-52556-172-9.

=== Articles ===
- Chernow, Ron (April 1974). "John Ford: The Last Frontiersman". Ramparts. Vol. 12. pp. 45–48.

== Filmography ==
- 1996: Biography, "J. Pierpont Morgan: Emperor of Wall Street" (documentary), as himself
- 2000: The American Experience, "The Rockefellers: Part 1" (documentary), as advisor
- 2000: The American Experience, "The Rockefellers: Part 2" (documentary), as advisor
- 2007: The American Experience, "Alexander Hamilton" (documentary), as advisor
- 2010: Tavis Smiley, "October 12, 2010 episode" (talk show), as guest
- 2010: Rediscovering Alexander Hamilton (documentary), as himself/historian
- 2020: Grant, as writer
