= Titan: The Life of John D. Rockefeller, Sr. =

1998 non-fiction book by Ron Chernow

- Front cover
- Author: Ron Chernow
- Language: English
- Subject: John D. Rockefeller
- Publisher: Random House
- Publication date: 1998
- Publication place: United States
- Media type: Print, audiobook, e-book
- Pages: 774 pages
- ISBN: 0679438084

Titan: The Life of John D. Rockefeller, Sr. is a 1998 non-fiction book by American author Ron Chernow. The book covers the life of the American business magnate John D. Rockefeller from his early days as the son of an itinerant snake-oil salesman, into his founding of Standard Oil and its massive success and eventual dissolution, and through the large-scale philanthropy that consumed much of his later life. At the time of its writing, the book was unique in its attempt at a balanced view of Rockefeller's career, bucking the trend of his biographers portraying him and his business practices as either good or evil. The book's release came while the federal government was considering pursuing an antitrust lawsuit against the Microsoft Corporation, and parallels were drawn by critics between that ongoing investigation and the one into Standard Oil's business practices.

The book was generally well received by critics, who mostly praised Chernow's meticulous research and neutral approach to describing the life of a polarizing figure, though some reviewers considered the account less neutral than others. It was called "a triumph of the art of biography" by The New York Times Book Review and became a finalist for the National Book Critics Circle Award for Biography.

== Background ==
John D. Rockefeller, former head of Standard Oil, died in 1937 at the age of 97. Shortly thereafter, in 1940, Allan Nevins released a two-volume study on the man's life and career that would be revised and published in 1953 as the single-volume Study in Power: John D. Rockefeller, Industrialist and Philanthropist. Nevins, who sought to burnish Rockefeller's reputation after its battering by Progressive and New Deal-era critics, painted the magnate's business ethics in a favorable light. Despite the Rockefeller family's release in the 1970s of his personal papers, by the beginning of the 1990s no significant biography of John Sr. had been attempted since Nevins.

After Chernow published his second book, The Warburgs, his publisher Random House suggested he pursue an in-depth profile of Rockefeller. Chernow was initially resistant, saying that Rockefeller's notorious secrecy around his private life would make it difficult for a biographer to learn about the man's inner thoughts and feelings. Chernow said this inability to "hear the music of his mind" made the prospect of multiple years of research unpalatable.

On a suggestion by his editor at Random House, Chernow visited the Rockefeller Archive Center in New York, home of the papers and records of Rockefeller University and the Rockefeller family. He discovered a 1,700-page transcript of private interviews conducted over three years late in the tycoon's life. The interviews, which showed an articulate, funny, and analytic side of Rockefeller, had yet to be used in a biography of the man, and Chernow decided to pursue the project. The book ultimately took five years to complete and according to Chernow took "the psychology and stamina of a marathon runner".

== Synopsis ==
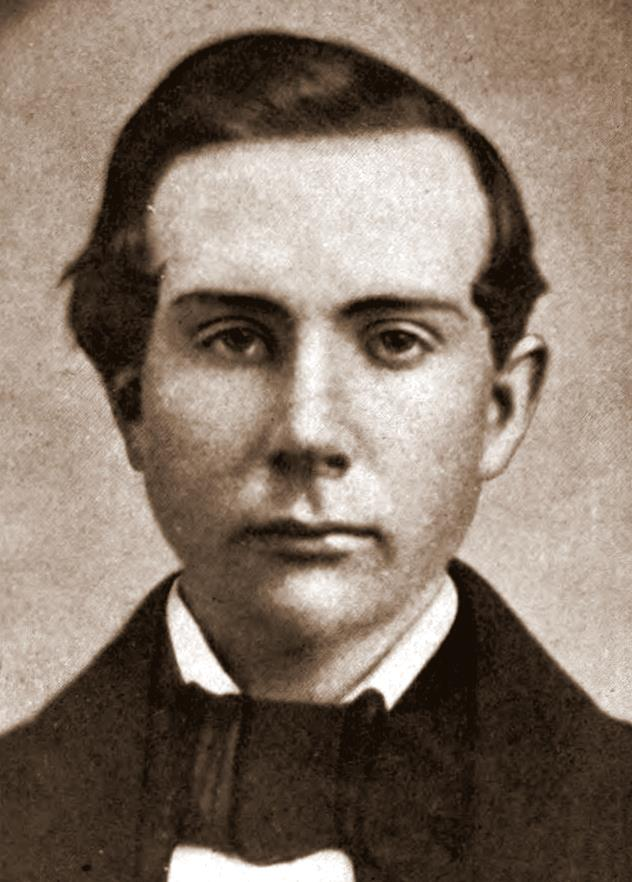
Rockfeller at 18 years old

Titan begins during Rockefeller's childhood and describes his formative years living with two very different parents: a devout Baptist mother and a traveling salesman father. William Avery Rockefeller was a grifter and peddler of snake oil health cures. A neighbor of the family once remarked, "They had a big jug full of medicine, and they treated all diseases from the same jug." William practiced bigamy as well. He abandoned the family for long stretches of time, much of it spent with an entirely separate family in Philadelphia. He also moved a mistress into the Rockefeller household and fathered children with both her and John's mother. Chernow traces John's longstanding Christian faith as well as his frugal nature to the influence, both positive and negative, of his parents.

Chernow continues tracking Rockefeller through the formation of what became Standard Oil, and describes how a Cleveland merchant with no great education or contacts came to control nearly all of the nation's oil refining industry. Chernow argues that Rockefeller recognized the "anarchy of production" that plagued unfettered capitalism, and that, "At times, when he railed against cutthroat competition and the vagaries of the business cycle, Rockefeller sounded more like Karl Marx than our classical image of the capitalist." His fellow oil refiners waged vicious price wars and refused to taper production even when new oil discoveries glutted the market with product. Chernow reveals that Rockefeller profited by buying out other refiners and thus curtailing competition, as well as by convincing railroads to give his company secret discounts on the shipment of his product.

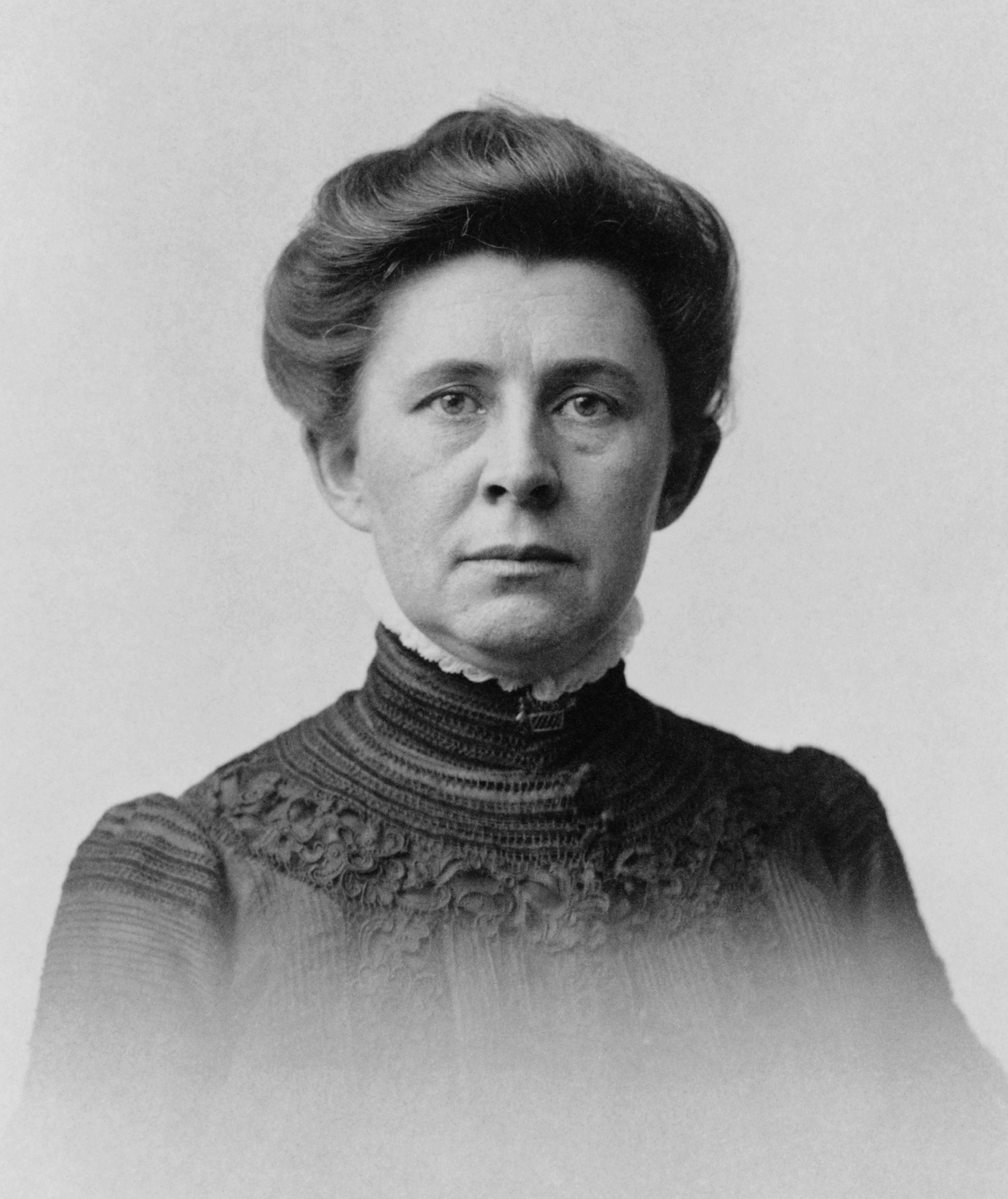
Ida Tarbell, author of The History of the Standard Oil Company (1904), which strongly criticized Rockefeller

These business practices incurred scrutiny, Chernow writes. Muckrakers in the press—notably, Ida Tarbell—published scathing, multi-part exposés about the oil trust's underhanded tactics. These pieces vilified Rockefeller, who by that time had largely, though not publicly, retired from his company's operations. He opted not to respond to Tarbell's widely popular series, which ultimately harmed his reputation even further. Tarbell's series and subsequent book raised public awareness of the oil trust; less than a decade later, it was broken up by the U.S. government.

After he retired, Rockefeller's public image shifted from that of the money-hungry tycoon to one of a charming old man who became equally obsessed with both golf and philanthropy. He became fixated on charity, and his innovation and ingenuity in distributing his rapidly accumulating wealth rivaled his ability to earn it. Chernow argues that while this charity was not entirely altruistic—a public relations firm was hired; gifts were made primarily to uncontroversial recipients—the donations were still made with Rockefeller's unwavering belief that he had received the money from God and God expected him to give it back. By the early 1920s, Rockefeller – who even in his youth had earmarked a portion of his earnings for charity – had donated $475 million (equivalent to $7.17 billion in 2025) to various causes, including towards the founding of the University of Chicago and the establishment of the Rockefeller Foundation. The latter institution became the standard by which other philanthropic enterprises sought to conduct their efforts, similar to how Standard Oil had shaped future practice in the business world.

== Analysis ==
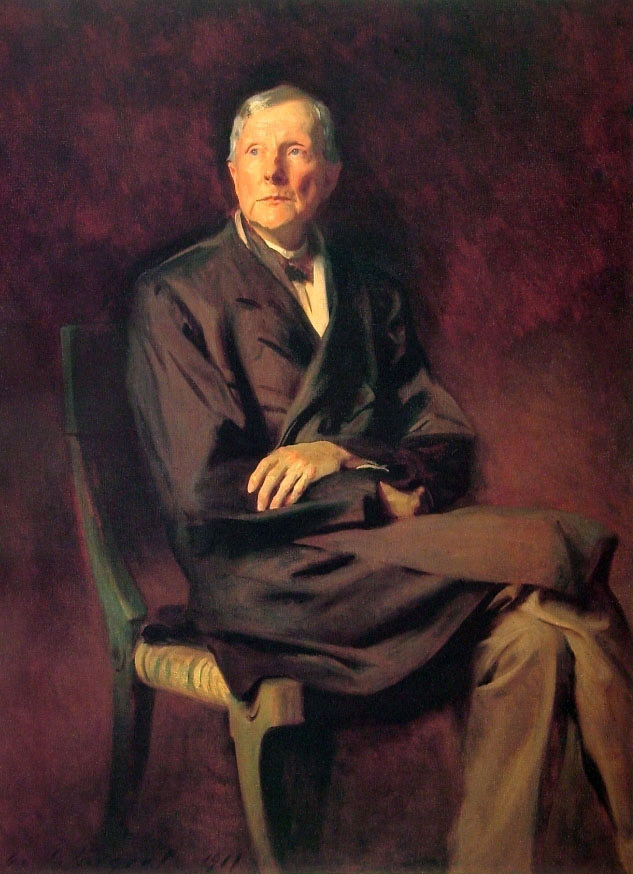
A 1917 portrait of Rockefeller by John Singer Sargent

Maury Klein of The Wall Street Journal was impressed with Chernow's well-rounded approach to a complex figure, saying, "Rockefeller's career is a minefield of controversies and complexities through which Mr. Chernow makes his way with admirable balance and judgment." In the Columbia Journalism Review, Lance Morrow approached the text with a critical eye towards Rockefeller's relationship with the press. He noted that Tarbell, whose father had been driven out of business by Standard Oil's tactics, was hardly a neutral party in her journalism, and that her hatred of Rockefeller both honed and skewed her reporting on the man and his company.

The economist Richard Parker wrote in the Los Angeles Times of Chernow's talent for providing "an immense, almost baroque detailing of a complex human life", but believed Chernow did not devote enough scrutiny to why Rockefeller was considered such a villain in his time, and that Chernow wrote "passingly" about the many corrupt and illegal acts practiced by Standard Oil while Rockefeller was at the helm. In The New Republic, critic Jackson Lears praised Chernow's ability to blend the book's biographical aspects with an overarching history of the eras spanned by the successive generations of Rockefellers. However, he believed that in striving for a neutral approach to his subject he ended up overly lenient, with a tendency even to "slide into sycophancy". Steve Weinberg of the Chicago Tribune called the book a "flawed gem", citing Chernow's "unforgettable portraits" of various members of Rockefeller's family and inner circle, while conceding that the author occasionally "cannot refrain from telling readers what to think."

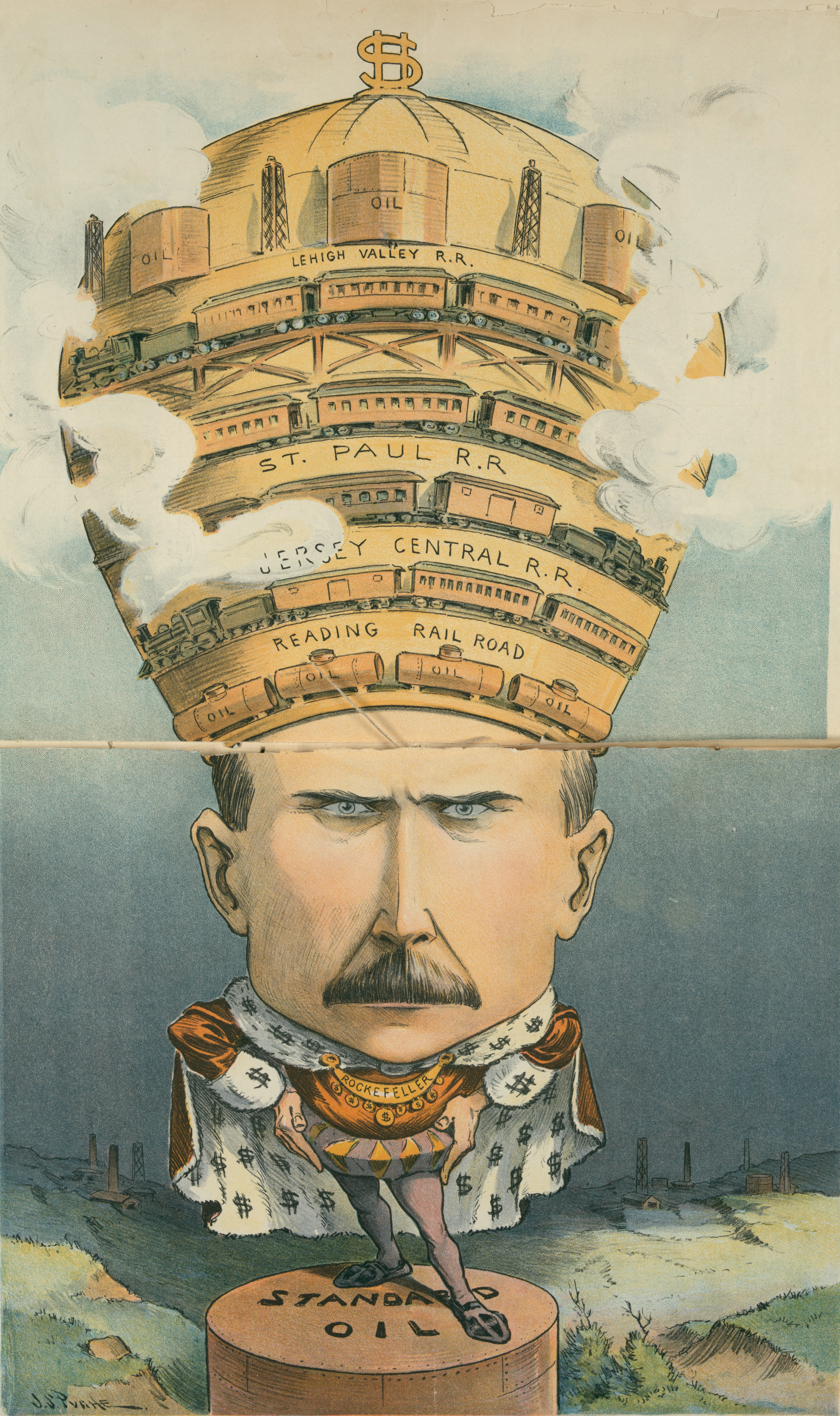
Rockefeller depicted in the magazine Puck

The writing and publication of Titan, a book largely about the creation of one of the largest and most powerful monopolies in America's history, coincided with the Justice Department's investigation of Microsoft and its competition-swallowing business practices. A month before Titan's release, Chernow wrote a column in The New York Times comparing and contrasting the two business giants and their respective situations. He also stated in an interview that he wished for the book to result in a nationwide conversation about both the high rate of corporate consolidation in America and the obligations of the wealthy to dispense their fortunes charitably. Brent Staples of Slate acknowledged the many reviews of the book that drew connections between Rockefeller and Microsoft's Bill Gates; however, he felt that aside from a shared failing to accurately judge the public's attitude, the men's relative situations were not overly similar.

== Reception ==
Titan was met with mostly positive reviews. Jack Beatty of The New York Times called it "unflaggingly interesting" and praised Chernow's depiction of Rockefeller's familial connections. Time Magazine's Lance Morrow said the book was "one of the great American biographies". A syndicated review from the Knight Ridder News Service named it "one of the outstanding books of the year".

In discussing the book's supplementary features, the Business History Review's Kenneth Warren was impressed with the wealth of accompanying photographs and Chernow's considerable amount of notes, but would have liked a map depicting the operations of Standard Oil's distribution. Writing for the Milwaukee Journal Sentinel, David Walton especially praised the title's abridged audiobook edition and called the use of George Plimpton as narrator "an inspired choice".

Titan was listed on The New York Times Best Seller list for 16 weeks, and its paperback version was a Publishers Weekly best seller in 1999 with over 75,000 copies sold. It was a finalist for the 1998 National Book Critics Circle Award for Biography.
