= Lewis Thomas Prize =

Literary prize for scientists

The Lewis Thomas Prize for Writing about Science, named for its first recipient, Lewis Thomas, is an annual literary prize awarded by The Rockefeller University to scientists or physicians deemed to have accomplished a significant literary achievement; it recognizes "scientists as poets." Originally called the Lewis Thomas Prize for the Scientist as Poet, the award was first given in 1993. Recipients' writings bridge the gap between the laboratory and the wider world, in the spirit of Lewis Thomas' collection of essays The Lives of a Cell.

The prize-giving ceremony is usually in the form of a lecture; winners receive a medal, a citation, and a cash award.

Subsequent recipients of the prize, awarded first for the year 1993 to Thomas, have been:

- François Jacob (for 1994)
- Abraham Pais (for 1995)
- Freeman Dyson (for 1996)
- Max Perutz (for 1997)
- Ernst Mayr (for 1998)
- Steven Weinberg (for 1999)
- E. O. Wilson (for 2000)
- Oliver Sacks (for 2001)
- Jared Diamond (for 2002)
- Richard Fortey (for 2003)
- Jean-Pierre Changeux (for 2004)
- Thomas Eisner (for 2005)
- Richard Dawkins (for 2006)
- James D. Watson (for 2007)
- Robert Sapolsky (for 2008)
- Martin Rees (for 2009)
- Kay Redfield Jamison (2012)
- Frances Ashcroft (2013)
- Atul Gawande (2014)
- Ian Stewart and Steven Strogatz (2015)
- Sean B Carroll (2016)
- Sylvia Earle (2017)
- Kip Thorne (2018)
- Siddhartha Mukherjee (2019)
- Richard Prum (2021)
- Jennifer L. Eberhardt (2022)
- Suzanne Simard (2023)
- Carlo Rovelli (2024)
- Stanislas Dehaene (2025)
- Chris Impey (2026)

== Videos of Lewis Thomas Prize lectures ==
- [2012-2022: https://www.rockefeller.edu/lewis-thomas-prize/recipients/].
