= Lambridge Wood =

Woodland in Oxfordshire, England

Coordinates: 51.555063°N 0.941971°W

- Site of Special Scientific Interest
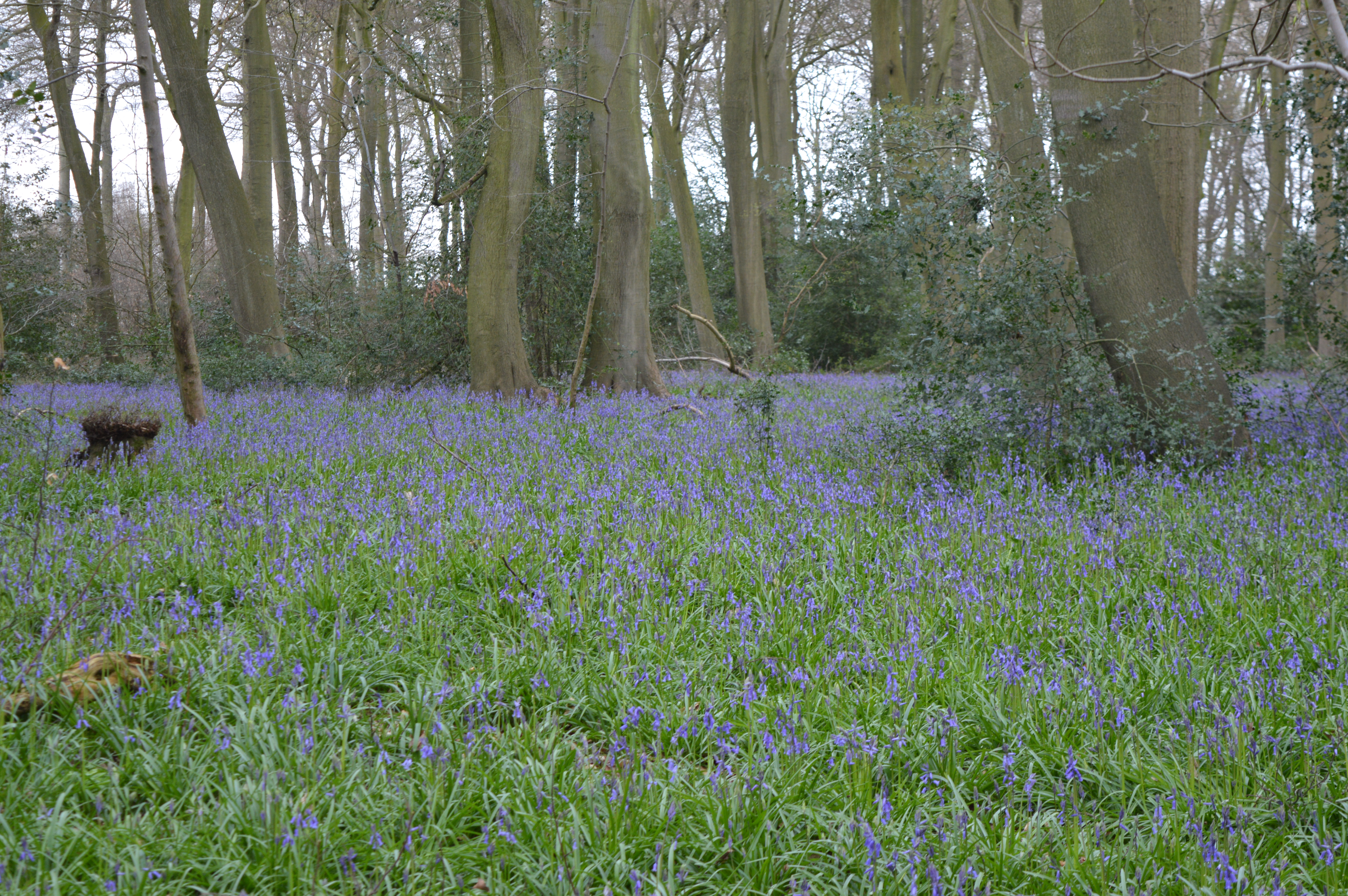
- Bluebells in Lambridge Wood
- Location of Lambridge Wood.
- Area of search: Oxfordshire
- Grid reference: SU734845
- Interest: Biological
- Area: 73.8 ha (182 acres)
- Notification date: 1984
- Location map: Magic Map

Lambridge Wood is a 73.8-hectare (182-acre) biological Site of Special Scientific Interest north-west of Henley-on-Thames in Oxfordshire. It is in the Chilterns Area of Outstanding Natural Beauty.

Soil types in the wood vary from calcareous to very acid. The main trees are beech, and other trees include oak, ash and wych elm. The understorey in mainly bramble, and in some areas bracken.

Using the money he made from his TV programmes, the paleontologist Richard Fortey purchased four acres of the wood called Grim’s Dyke Wood, named after Grim's Ditch. He wrote up his investigation into its fauna and flora in The Wood for the Trees: The Long View of Nature from a Small Wood. The book claims that this patch of woodland is the very one that John Stuart Mill who, after a walk through it argued that such woods are “the great beauty of this country”.

Access routes include a footpath from Henley through Badgemore Park Golf Club.
