= Mark Twain (book) =

2025 book by Ron Chernow

- Author: Ron Chernow
- Language: English
- Subject: Mark Twain
- Publisher: Penguin Press
- Publication date: May 13, 2025
- Pages: 1200
- ISBN: 978-0-525-56172-9

Mark Twain (2025) is a non-fiction biography by Pulitzer Prize-winning author Ron Chernow, published on May 13, 2025, by Penguin Press. The book chronicles the life of Samuel Langhorne Clemens, better known by his pen name Mark Twain and praised as the "greatest humorist the United States has produced," with William Faulkner calling him "the father of American literature". Tracing Twain's journey from his Missouri childhood and early career as a steamboat pilot to his rise as a celebrated journalist, satirist, and author of classics such as The Adventures of Tom Sawyer and Adventures of Huckleberry Finn, Chernow explores Twain's complex persona, political commentary, and engagement with issues like slavery amid America's 19th-century transformation. Drawing on archival materials, the biography examines Twain's pursuit of fame, financial struggles, personal tragedies, and enduring literary legacy.

As of May 2026, Mark Twain had sold 119,259 copies in hardcover.
