= Richard Prum =

American ornithologist and evolutionary biologist

Richard Owen Prum
- Born: 1961 (age 64–65)
- Education: Harvard University (AB); University of Michigan (PhD)
- Known for: Avian biology
- Spouse: Ann Johnson Prum
- Awards: Fulbright Scholar (2001) Guggenheim Fellowship (2007); MacArthur Fellowship (2009) Lewis Thomas Prize (2021)
- Scientific career
- Fields: Evolutionary biology, Ornithology
- Workplaces: American Museum of Natural History University of Kansas Yale University
- Website: https://prumlab.yale.edu/

Richard O. Prum (born 1961) is an evolutionary biologist and ornithologist. He is the William Robertson Coe Professor of Ornithology, Ecology and Evolutionary Biology at Yale University, as well as the head curator of vertebrate zoology at the university's Peabody Museum of Natural History. His 2017 book The Evolution of Beauty: How Darwin's Forgotten Theory of Mate Choice Shapes the Animal World—and Us was named one of the 10 Best Books of 2017 by The New York Times and was a finalist for the 2018 Pulitzer Prize in General Nonfiction.

== Life and work ==
Prum describes himself as "an evolutionary ornithologist with broad interests in diverse topics, including phylogenetics, behavior, feathers, structural coloration, evolution and development, sexual selection, and historical biogeography."

External videos
- Ornithologist Richard Prum: 2009 MacArthur Fellow | MacArthur Foundation (September 21, 2009).
- The Evolution of Beauty: Richard Prum at TEDxYale (June 2, 2013).
- Richard Prum: Evolution and Beauty at the Chicago Humanities Festival (November 15, 2017).
- Richard Prum on Birds, Beauty, and Finding Your Own Way (full) | Conversations with Tyler with the Mercatus Center (June 30, 2021).

Prum grew up in rural Vermont. He received his bachelor's degree at Harvard University in 1983 and completed his doctorate at the University of Michigan at Ann Arbor in 1989. He then worked at the American Museum of Natural History until 1991, when he became a professor in the Department of Ecology and Evolutionary Biology at the University of Kansas. After gradually losing his hearing throughout the early 1990s due to illness, Prum moved from primarily doing field work to conducting research on plumage pigmentation, feather evolution, and Darwin's sexual selection theory. Prum was a Fulbright scholar to Brazil in 2001, and he was awarded a Guggenheim Fellowship in 2007 and a MacArthur Fellowship in 2009.

Prum published The Evolution of Beauty: How Darwin's Forgotten Theory of Mate Choice Shapes the Animal World – And Us, a book on the role of beauty in natural selection, in 2017. In 2021, he received the Lewis Thomas Prize for his "exceptional writing".

Prum's second book, Performance All the Way Down: Genes, Development, and Sexual Difference, was published in 2023.

== Reception ==
In his book Survival of the Beautiful, David Rothenberg reflects on Prum's analysis of sexual selection in birds, considering whether female birds are exercising an aesthetic sense when they choose a mate. Rothenburg argues Prum's position, that the females' aesthetic choice is essentially arbitrary and decoupled from natural selection: anything the females begin to choose becomes what the males must have if they are to have any offspring. (Note: Rothenberg, 2011. pp 74–101.) The aesthetic aspect of sexual selection has been debated since the start of Darwinism in the nineteenth century. Prum is following Edward Bagnall Poulton, who was criticised by Alfred Russel Wallace for asserting "female preferences based on aesthetic considerations". In Rothenberg's words, Wallace "had no place for Darwin's love of beauty, caprice, and feminine whim". (Note: Rothenberg, 2011. pp 36.) Prum, on the other hand, considers art and male sexual display to be "coevolution of the work and its appreciation". (Note: Rothenberg, 2011. pp. 101.)

== Books ==
- The Evolution of Beauty: How Darwin's Forgotten Theory of Mate Choice Shapes the Animal World – And Us (2017)
- Performance All the Way Down: Genes, Development, and Sexual Difference (2023)
