= Anarchy of production =

In Marxist theory, anarchy of production is a characteristic feature of all commodity production based on private property, which is the primary mode of production in the capitalist market economy. The term is often used as a criticism of market economies, emphasizing their chaotic and volatile nature in contrast to the stable nature of planned economies, as proposed by Marxists.

The term describes an economy coordinated by no single directing authority, in contrast to the deliberate, centralized allocation of resources envisioned under socialism. As individuals and firms make production and investment decisions independently, in response to price signals and the information available to them in anticipation of profits, Marxists hold that the aggregate pattern of production is fundamentally flawed and does not coordinate between what is produced and what is needed for society.

== Examples ==
The results of the unplanned "anarchy" of the capitalist market system can be seen in the crisis of overproduction, and underconsumption. One such example, according to the Socialist Party of Great Britain, was the 2008 financial crisis.

== Criticisms ==
Economists have long disputed the premise that decentralized production is "anarchic", arguing that a form or order emerges from the interactions of many individuals without requiring a central planner. In particular, Austrian economists Friedrich Hayek and Ludwig von Mises have criticized the theory.

Hayek has argued that market prices function as a decentralized communication mechanism, transmitting to producers and consumers the information they need to coordinate their plan with others. This knowledge is tacit, based on time and circumstances, and changing continuously. Thus, no central authority can possess this knowledge needed to direct the economy, which is the "result of human action but not of human design". Mises has argued that without private ownership of means of production, and market exchange that makes it possible, there are no genuine price of capital goods, and thus there is no way for central planners to calculate whether a given use of resource is efficient or wasteful.

== See also ==
- Anti-capitalism
- Criticism of capitalism
- Marxism
