= A Children's Bible =

2020 novel by Lydia Millet

- First edition
- Author: Lydia Millet
- Language: English
- Publisher: W. W. Norton & Company
- Publication date: 12 May 2020
- Publication place: United States
- Pages: 240
- ISBN: 978-1324005032

A Children's Bible is a climate fiction novel by Lydia Millet that documents the experience of a group of children in the face of climate change as their parents fail to respond to a climate-charged hurricane. It was her 13th novel.

== Plot ==
=== Context ===
Eve, the novel's narrator, belongs to a group of children staying at a large, rented estate with their parents for the summer. The children, mostly disgusted by their parents' hedonistic behavior, spend most of their time on the property of the estate, until a hurricane interrupts their activities. The parents are never named, and the book filters their activities through the perception of Eve and the other children.

== Development and writing ==
Millet has said that the novel does not take place in an "alternate world, simply this one" and believes that words such as apocalyptic or dystopian used to describe the book apply equally to contemporary life. Millet enjoyed writing the book.

== Reception ==
=== Critical reception ===
The New York Times book review called the book a "potent allegory". The Wall Street Journal review of the novel focuses on how the novel has humor in the face of a grim plot. Time listed the novel as one of the 100 Must-Read Books of 2020. Jonathan Dee, in the same New York Times review, compared the novel's setting to that of Susan Minot's book Monkeys.

=== Honors ===
The novel was shortlisted for the 2020 National Book Award for Fiction. It was included on the list published by The New York Times of the best books of 2020.
