= The Evolution of Beauty =

2017 book by Richard O. Prum

The Evolution of Beauty: How Darwin's Forgotten Theory of Mate Choice Shapes the Animal World—and Us
- First Hardcover edition
- Author: Richard O. Prum
- Language: English
- Genre: Non-fiction
- Publisher: Doubleday
- Publication date: 2017
- Publication place: United States
- Media type: Print, e-book, audio
- Pages: 448 pp.
- ISBN: 978-0385537216

The Evolution of Beauty: How Darwin's Forgotten Theory of Mate Choice Shapes the Animal World—and Us is a 2017 book by the ornithologist and evolutionary biologist Richard O. Prum about the power of aesthetic mate choice, arguing it to be an important independent agent in evolution. Prum indicates that while Charles Darwin made this argument in The Descent of Man, published in 1871, the concept was sidelined and forgotten and the notion of natural selection being the sole driver of evolution took over. As an ornithologist, Prum describes many examples in avian evolution where aesthetics are preeminent. Prum proceeds to apply the principle of aesthetic evolution as an independent force in human evolution.

== Contents ==
Prum indicates that Darwin recognizing difficulties in the theory of natural selection advanced the view that sexual selection is an additional force in evolution and presented this argument in The Descent of Man. Alfred Russel Wallace, St. George Mivart and other early evolutionists helped to elevate natural selection as the only force in evolution and delegated sexual selection to a subsidiary role. It was argued that sexual selection was based on recognition of markers of survival fitness, so that, for instance in birds, male ornamentation advertises superior health.

Prum describes numerous examples in avian evolution where evolved traits seem to contradict selection of individual fitness. Examples are the decorative feathers of the male great argus, the dances of the male red-capped manakin, and the flight patterns of the male golden-winged manakin. The wing structure of the male club-winged manakin demonstrates "decadence" as the wing is modulated for singing and less well adapted for flight. In all these examples female mate choice is at work. Prum follows Darwin in seeing sexual mate choice as being grounded in aesthetics; it is not linked to functionality.

In Prum's "Beauty Happens" hypothesis, mates may have arbitrary preferences for certain traits and their offspring inherit not only the traits but also the preference for them leading to a runaway co-evolution, a concept envisioned by Ronald Fisher a century ago. This self-organizing process will lead to a standard of beauty by itself without any adaptive benefit.

Mate choice can lead to sexual conflict when female sexual autonomy and male sexual control collide. Prum's chapter on duck sex shows how female ducks evolved having convoluted vaginas to protect themselves against effects of forced copulation. A description of bowerbird courtship demonstrates complex "artistic" constructions by males to lure female mates whereby these constructions seem to provide some sort of aesthetic value and safety for the female.

In the last third of the book, Prum looks at human evolution, specifically how female preferences may have shaped us as a species over time. Female and male desire and behavior co-evolved leading to pronounced secondary sexual characteristics, prolonged sex, sexual variety, and an uncoupling of sex and fertility. Prum's view of sexual selection helps to understand the development of homosexuality, monogamy, female orgasm, and capacity of sex outside of the fertile period.

== Reception ==
David Dobbs indicates that Prum's view is controversial but that he makes his case with clarity, grace, and charm, namely that aesthetic courtship gives females sexual choice, autonomy and safety. While he does not agree with all points, Adrian Barnett seems to like the new look at Darwin's work: "The problem is, it seems, that we all think we know Darwin. In fact, few of us go back to the original, instead taking for granted what other people say he said. In this case, it seems to have created a bit of validation by wish fulfilment: Darwin's views on sexual selection, Prum says, have been 'laundered, re-tailored and cleaned-up for ideological purity'." Ed Yong writes that Prum's book is an explicitly feminist book that is focused on female choice and observes that freedom of sexual choice arises from evolution and shapes evolution.

Reception among evolutionary biologists has been less positive. Although Douglas Futuyma recommended the book as "marvelously interesting and well-written, sometimes erudite and sometimes humorous", he suggests that Prum mischaracterizes the views of evolutionary biologists and says that findings from theoretical population genetics undermine the fundamental premise of the book. Jerry Coyne criticized an essay by Prum in The New York Times that was adapted from The Evolution of Beauty, stating that it is "both erroneous and confusing, for it misrepresents sexual selection, natural selection, and modern evolutionary theory." He later described the book as a "mixed bag" but stated that the bad parts outweighed the good, and stated that Prum's arguments were "tendentious". Evolutionary biologists Gerald Borgia and Gregory Ball state that Prum misrepresents opposition of scientists to the model of runaway selection and that he fails to make a case for its ubiquity. Further, they claim Prum inappropriately injects politics into biology, conflating eugenics and genocide with female mate choice to encourage readers to accept his arguments on political rather than scientific grounds. Gail Patricelli, Eileen Hebets, and Tamra Mendelson, while describing the book as containing "engaging descriptions of the natural world", criticize Prum's reasoning, description of modern sexual selection research, and conclusions.

== Awards ==
- New York Times 10 Best Books of the Year: Winner, 2017
- Pulitzer Prize for General Nonfiction: Finalist, 2018
