= Leo Damrosch =

American author and professor

Leopold Damrosch Jr. (born 1941) is an American author and professor. In 2001, he was named the Ernest Bernbaum Professor of Literature at Harvard University. He received a B.A. from Yale University, an M.A. from Cambridge University, where he was a Marshall Scholar, and a Ph.D. from Princeton University. His areas of academic specialty include Romanticism, the Enlightenment, and Puritanism.

Damrosch's The Sorrows of the Quaker Jesus is one of the most important recent explorations of the early history of the Society of Friends. His Jean-Jacques Rousseau: Restless Genius (2005) was a National Book Award finalist for nonfiction and winner of the 2006 L. L. Winship/PEN New England Award for best work of nonfiction. Among his other books are Symbol and Truth in Blake's Myth (1980), God's Plot and Man's Stories: Studies in the Fictional Imagination from Milton to Fielding (1985), Fictions of Reality in the Age of Hume and Johnson (1989), Tocqueville's Discovery of America (2010), Jonathan Swift: His Life and His World (2013), Eternity's Sunrise: The Imaginative World of William Blake (2015), The Club (2019), about the Friday Club including Samuel Johnson, Boswell, Joshua Reynolds, voted one of the 10 best books of 2019 by The New York Times.

== Awards and honors ==
- 2013 National Book Critics Circle Award (Biography), winner for Jonathan Swift
- Winship/PEN New England Award for nonfiction for Jean-Jacques Rousseau: Restless Genius (2005)
- Finalist, National Book Award for Nonfiction for Jean-Jacques Rousseau: Restless Genius (2005)

== Bibliography ==
- Samuel Johnson and the Tragic Sense. Princeton University Press, 1972.
- The Uses of Johnson's Criticism. University Press of Virginia, 1976.
- Symbol and Truth in Blake's Myth. Princeton University Press, 1980.
- God's Plot and Man's Stories: Studies in the Fictional Imagination from Milton to Fielding. University of Chicago Press, 1985.
- The Imaginative World of Alexander Pope. University of California Press, 1987.
- Modern Essays on Eighteenth-Century Literature (editor). Oxford University Press, 1988.
- Fictions of Reality in the Age of Hume and Johnson. University of Wisconsin Press, 1989.
- The Profession of Eighteenth-century Literature: Reflections on an Institution (editor). University of Wisconsin Press, 1992.
- The Sorrows of the Quaker Jesus: James Nayler and the Puritan Crackdown on the Free Spirit. Harvard University Press, 1996.
- Jean-Jacques Rousseau: Restless Genius. Houghton Mifflin Harcourt, 2005.
- Tocqueville's Discovery of America. Farrar, Straus & Giroux, 2010.
- Jonathan Swift: His Life and His World. Yale University Press, 2013.
- Eternity's Sunrise: The Imaginative World of William Blake. Yale University Press, 2015.
- The Club: Johnson, Boswell, and the Friends Who Shaped an Age. Yale University Press, 2019.
- Adventurer: The Life and Times of Giacomo Casanova. Yale University Press, 2022.
- Storyteller: The Life of Robert Louis Stevenson. Yale University Press, 2025.
