= Alexander Hamilton (book) =

2004 biography

- Author: Ron Chernow
- Language: English
- Subject: Alexander Hamilton
- Publisher: Penguin Press
- Publication date: April 26, 2004
- Publication place: United States
- Media type: Print, digital, audio
- Pages: 818 (hardcover)
- ISBN: 978-1-59420-009-0
- Dewey Decimal: 973.4092
- LC Class: E302.6.H2 2004

Alexander Hamilton is a 2004 biography of American statesman Alexander Hamilton, written by biographer Ron Chernow. Hamilton, one of the Founding Fathers of the United States, was an instrumental promoter of the U.S. Constitution, founder of the nation's financial system, and its first secretary of the treasury.

The book, which was met with mostly positive acclaim, went on to win the inaugural George Washington Book Prize for early American history and was a nominee for the 2005 National Book Critics Circle Award in biography. In 2015, the book was adapted into the musical Hamilton by playwright Lin-Manuel Miranda. The stage production went on to win numerous accolades, including 11 Tony Awards.

== Background ==
Before working on Alexander Hamilton, Chernow had previously written multiple books in the topics of business and finance. In 1990, he published The House of Morgan, which covered the life of financier J.P. Morgan and went on to win the National Book Award for Nonfiction. In 1998, he wrote a biography about John D. Rockefeller which remained on The New York Times Best Seller list for 16 weeks. In 1999, Chernow shifted his emphasis away from business moguls to start a biography in a new topic, American politics. He later cited his change in focus, "as a way to broaden my scope, and to stay fresh" after being inundated with requests for further biographies about Gilded Age industrialists such as Andrew Carnegie and Cornelius Vanderbilt. Therefore, Chernow called Hamilton his "exit strategy". This book would allow a foray into constitutional law and foreign policy while still including a large financial dimension.

Chernow began the writing process in 1998 by going through more than 22,000 pages of Hamilton's papers and archival research around the world. He described Hamilton's extensive writing by calling him "the human word machine", saying he "must have produced the maximum number of words that a human being can scratch out in 49 years". Over the course of his writing and research, Chernow also took the time to dive deeper into Hamilton's history. He held the dueling pistols used in the fatal Burr–Hamilton duel, visited the jail cell on Saint Croix where Hamilton's mother was imprisoned, went to the island of Bequia in Saint Vincent and the Grenadines to which Hamilton's father disappeared after abandoning his illegitimate son, and had a lock of Alexander's hair genetically tested for his racial makeup. Chernow explained Hamilton in his book by stating, "If Washington is the father of the country and Madison the father of the Constitution, then Alexander Hamilton was surely the father of the American government."

== Critical response ==
Following its release in 2004, Alexander Hamilton was nominated for the National Book Critics Circle Award in biography. In 2005, it won the inaugural $50,000 George Washington Book Prize for early American history. The book spent three months on The New York Times Best Seller list after its release, and then returned to the list in 2015 after the release of Hamilton: An American Musical.

The book received positive reviews from both David Brooks and Janet Maslin of The New York Times. Brooks wrote, "[while] other writers...have done better jobs describing Hamilton's political philosophy, nobody has captured Hamilton himself as fully and as beautifully as Chernow." Maslin praised Chernow's biographical ability to "add a third dimension to conventional views of Hamilton while reaching beyond the limits of a personal portrait".

However, Benjamin Schwarz, writing for The Atlantic, criticized the book, blaming Chernow's unfamiliarity with revolutionary American politics. While he praised Chernow's earlier biographies about Morgan and Rockefeller, his review of Hamilton stated, "he's just as obviously not at home in the eighteenth century; his grasp of its religion, attitudes, and intellectual history is unsure, and he lacks command of the ideological, political, sectional, and social differences that divided the early republic." Justin Martin, writing for the San Francisco Chronicle additionally thought the book "dry and speculative," as well as slow in pace; "one can only assume that Chernow, despite his abundant talent, is in the grip of a silly literary convention, namely, that bios of major figures must be very, very long."

== Stage adaptation ==
Beginning in 2008, Chernow worked with Lin-Manuel Miranda as the historical consultant to Miranda's newly conceived Broadway production, Hamilton. Miranda had picked up a copy of Chernow's book while on vacation and, after finishing the first few chapters, realized its potential as a musical. Through a mutual friend, Chernow attended a performance of In the Heights where he met with Miranda backstage. Miranda told Chernow that he saw "hip-hop songs rising off the page" while reading the biography and wanted his help as a historical consultant for the musical.

For six years, Chernow helped guide Miranda through the process of writing Hamilton. The musical debuted on January 20, 2015, at The Public Theater in New York City. It went on to receive a record-setting 16 Tony nominations, winning 11, including Best Musical, and was also the recipient of the 2016 Grammy Award for Best Musical Theater Album. The musical also won the 2016 Pulitzer Prize for Drama.

After the success of the musical, a paperback edition of Alexander Hamilton was released featuring the musical's logo on its cover. Sales soared from 3,300 copies in 2014 to 106,000 in 2015, and the book returned to The New York Times best-seller list. Likewise, it returned to the list of top 50 best sellers according to USA Today. With its re-release, additional reviews of the biography have appeared, notably in The Guardian and The Times. Following the musical's opening in Europe the book began printing for the first time in the United Kingdom.
