= The Club (Damrosch book) =

2019 book by Leo Damrosch

The Club: Johnson, Boswell, and the Friends Who Shaped an Age
- Author: Leo Damrosch
- Language: English
- Subject: The Club
- Publisher: Yale University Press
- Publication date: March 26, 2019
- Pages: 488
- ISBN: 978-0-300-21790-2

The Club: Johnson, Boswell, and the Friends Who Shaped an Age is a 2019 book by Leo Damrosch that examines The Club.
