= Life: A Natural History of the First Four Billion Years of Life on Earth =

Book by Richard Fortey

- Cover of the first edition
- Author: Richard Fortey
- Original title: Life: An Unauthorised Biography
- Illustrator: Cassandra J. Pappas (design); Jerry Bauer (photos)
- Language: English
- Subject: Natural history
- Published: 1997 (HarperCollins)
- Publication place: United States
- Media type: Print (hardcover · paperback)
- Pages: 346 (paperback edition)
- ISBN: 0-375-40119-9
- Dewey Decimal: 576.8 21
- LC Class: QH366.2 .F69 1998

Life: A Natural History of the First Four Billion Years of Life on Earth is a book about natural history by British paleontologist Richard A. Fortey. It was originally published in hardcover in Great Britain by HarperCollins Publishers, under the title Life: An Unauthorised Biography. Fortey used this book to explain how life has evolved over the last four billion years. He discusses evolution, biology, the origin of life, and paleontology. Under its various titles Fortey's book has become a best-seller; according to WorldCat, it is in over a thousand public libraries in the United States alone.

== Reception ==
Jerry Coyne writes "no one can finish Life without having accrued considerable knowledge of evolutionary history and a sense of the excitement of discovery that can be conveyed only by a professional scientist chipping away at the rock face of his discipline. Anyone with the slightest interest in biology should read this book, pass it along to those who think that paleontology begins and ends with dinosaurs and then reflect on the many other curious creatures that, as part of the missing 99 percent of the history of life, will be forever unknown to us."

It was named one of the best books of the year by The New York Times.
