= The House of Morgan =

1990 non-fiction book by Ron Chernow

- Author: Ron Chernow
- Subject: Finance
- Genre: History, biography
- Publisher: Atlantic Monthly Press
- Publication date: 1990
- Publication place: United States
- Media type: Print (hardcover)
- Pages: 812
- ISBN: 0-87113-338-5
- OCLC: 20015083

The House of Morgan: An American Banking Dynasty and the Rise of Modern Finance is a non-fiction book by Ron Chernow, published in 1990. It traces the history of four generations of the J.P. Morgan financial empire, on both sides of the Atlantic, from its obscure beginnings in Victorian London to the crash of 1987.

The reviewer for The New York Times Book Review said, "As a portrait of finance, politics and the world of avarice and ambition on Wall Street, the book has the movement and tension of an epic novel. It is, quite simply, a tour de force."

Chernow later completed a history of the German-Jewish Warburg banking family (The Warburgs, 1993) and a collection of the essays on "the decline and fall of the great financial dynasties" (The Death of the Banker, 1997).

== Awards ==
The book won the 1990 U.S. National Book Award for Nonfiction and the 1991 Ambassador Book Award for Biography.
