= Richard Fortey =

British paleontologist (1946–2025)

Richard Fortey OBE FRS FRSL
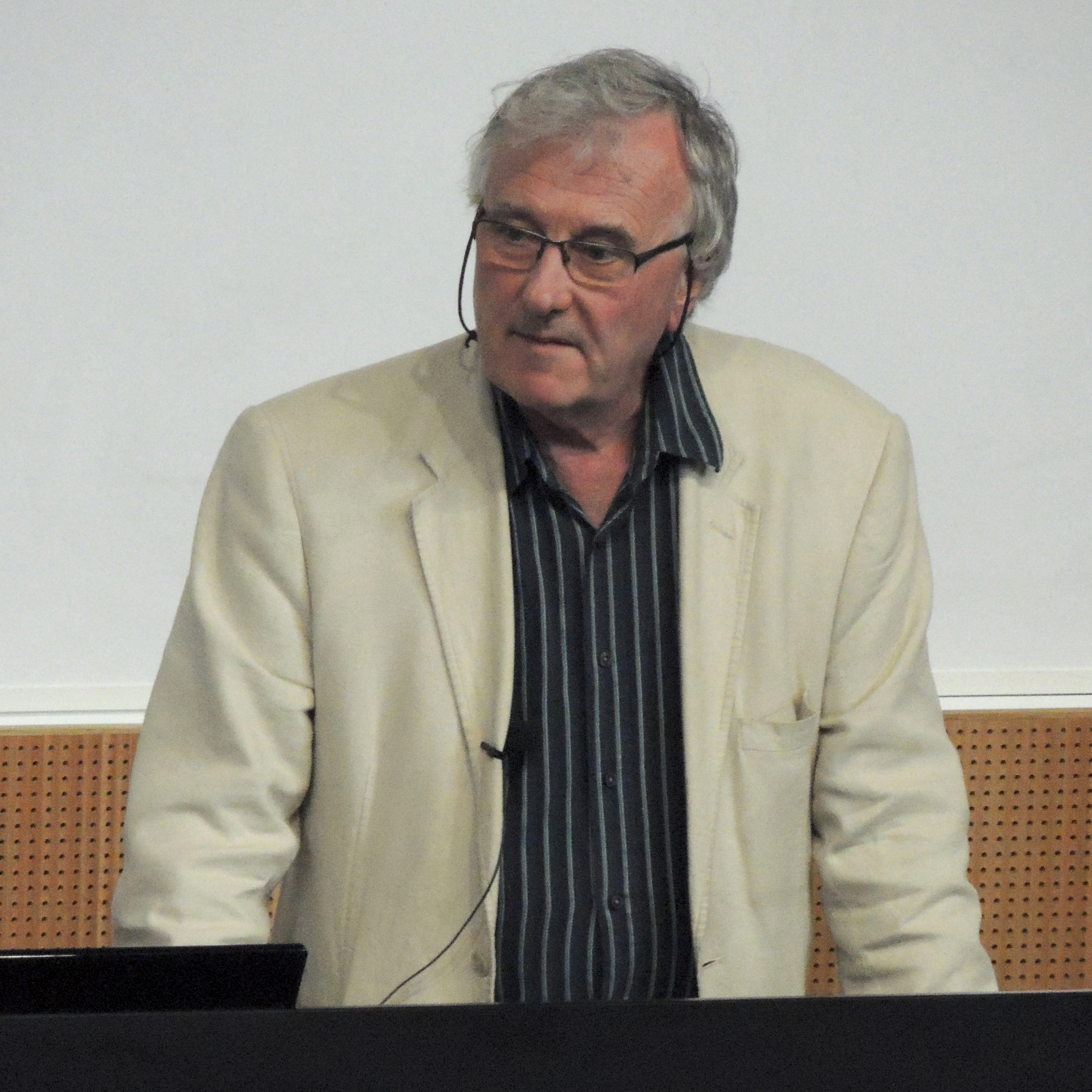
- Fortey in 2014
- Born: Richard Alan Fortey; 15 February 1946; Ealing, London, England
- Died: 7 March 2025 (aged 79)
- Awards: Frink Medal (2000); Fellow of the Royal Society; Michael Faraday Prize (2006); Linnean Medal (2006)
- Scientific career
- Fields: Paleontology
- Workplaces: University of Cambridge; Natural History Museum
- Thesis: Stratigraphy, Palaeoecology and Trilobite Faunas of the Valhallfonna Formation NY Friesland, Spitsberge
- Doctoral advisor: Harry B. Whittington

Richard Alan Fortey (15 February 1946 – 7 March 2025) was a British palaeontologist, natural historian, writer and television presenter, who served as president of the Geological Society of London for its bicentennial year of 2007. As a paleontologist, he specialised in trilobites and other extinct arthropods, as well as the life and paleogeography of the Paleozoic era, particularly the Ordovician. He wrote popular science books, notably Life: An Unauthorised Biography (1998) and Earth: An Intimate History (2005). Among other honors, he won the Lewis Thomas Prize and the Royal Society's Michael Faraday Award. Steven Brusatte said "Whenever I write, I try to channel the wit, wisdom, and warmth of Richard Fortey.”

== Background ==
Fortey was born in Ealing, West London in 1946, to Frank Fortey, who ran two fishing tackle shops, and Margaret Wilshin. He spent much of his early years "half-wild in the countryside" near Newbury in Berkshire, where his family owned a caravan and later a cottage by a chalk stream.

During a trip to Pembrokeshire when he was 14, Fortey discovered his first trilobite. He recalled:

The rock simply parted around the animal like some sort of revelation. Surely what I held was the textbook come alive. The long, thin eyes of the trilobite regarded me and I returned the gaze. More compelling than any pair of blue eyes, there was a shiver of recognition across 500 million years.

He won a place at Ealing Grammar School for Boys. While preparing to sit his scholarship exams for King's College, Cambridge, his father died in a car crash. He read Natural Sciences specialising in geology and got a first class degree in 1968. His natural sciences tutor as an undergraduate was Harry B. Whittington, one of the world’s foremost experts on trilobites.

As a 21-year-old undergraduate, Fortey went on an expedition to Spitsbergen in the archipelago of Svalbard collecting triobites. Per The Times, "With the sole company of an older student with whom he had 'little in common', Fortey spent weeks huddling in tents as blizzards ripped across the tundra, armed with a stack of Russian novels such as War and Peace." The trilobites he discovered attracted international attention, including from the palaeontologist David Bruton, who organised a second expedition to Spitsbergen in 1971 to collect further samples. All the 100 species of trilobites he discovered were new to science and provided the basis for his PhD.

He received a PhD and DSc from the University of Cambridge. He did his PhD under Whittington.

== Natural History Museum, London ==
Ealing Grammar School had a geology teacher who took Fortey in his school class to London's Natural History Museum. He "pointed to a door where, he said, lived 'experts who work on fossils'." Fortey recalled thinking "I’d like to be that." In 1970, he became a research fellow at the Natural History Museum, and spent his entire career there as a palaeontologist. He retired in 2006. His speciality was trilobites and graptolites, especially those from the Ordovician and their systematics, evolution and modes of life. He was also involved in research on Ordovician palaeogeography and correlation; arthropod evolution, especially the origin of major groups and the relationships between divergence times, as revealed by molecular evidence and the fossil record. He wrote about the museum's history in Dry Store Room No. 1.

== Author ==
Fortey authored popular science books on a range of subjects including geology, palaeontology, evolution and natural history. His first popular book was Fossils: The Key to the Past (1982). He explained “When people look slightly surprised as to how I could spend all day apparently studying one trilobite, I have to explain that actually I’m a historian of several hundred millions of years, so there’s plenty to do.” He recalled a “rather pompous” essay by Aldous Huxley about the distinction between science and letters. Fortey said “I’d very much like to erase that distinction by example. So I’ve used some novelistic tricks in all my books, quite consciously, I suppose.” He wrote Life: An Unauthorised Biography (1998) and Earth: An Intimate History (2005).

== Television ==
From 2012, he was a television presenter appearing on BBC Four presenting natural history programmes; was Collier Professor for the Public Understanding of Science and Technology at the Institute of Advanced Studies in the University of Bristol 2002 and visiting professor of Palaeobiology at the University of Oxford 1999–2009.

Fortey appeared in several of David Attenborough's programmes, including the second episode of Lost Worlds, Vanished Lives (1989), and First Life (2010), travelling with the presenter to the Atlas Mountains to find and film trilobite fossils. He contributed to the speculative Discovery Channel documentary series The Future Is Wild.

In 2012, Fortey presented the BBC Four series Survivors: Nature's Indestructible Creatures, which looked at species that had survived extinction events. In 2013, he presented the BBC Four programme The Secret Life of Rock Pools, which aired on 16 April 2013.

In 2014, Fortey presented the BBC Four three part series Fossil Wonderlands: Nature's Hidden Treasures, followed by The Magic of Mushrooms, in which he showed that fungi had close but still poorly understood inter-relationships with plants and animals including man. In 2016, he presented the BBC Four programme Nature’s Wonderlands: Islands of Evolution, a three part series on island biogeography.

He appeared on BBC Two's University Challenge – The Professionals in 2004, as a member of the Palaeontological Association team, who beat the Eden Project.

=== Grim’s Dyke Wood ===
Using the money he made from his TV work Fortey bought four acres of woodland in Lambridge Wood, Oxfordshire, the section of the wood being called Grim’s Dyke Wood (named after Grim's Ditch) and he wrote up his investigation into its fauna and flora in the book: The Wood for the Trees.

== Death ==
Fortey died after a short illness on 7 March 2025, at the age of 79.

== Awards and honours ==
For his research, he won the Geological Society of London's Lyell Medal, the Linnean Society of London's Linnean Medal for Zoology, the Zoological Society of London's Frink Medal and the Geological Society of Glasgow's T. N. George Medal. In 1997, he was elected as a fellow of the Royal Society. Fortey was elected president of the Geological Society of London for its bicentennial year of 2007 and was awarded honorary degrees by the University of St Andrews; the Open University; the Birmingham University and Leicester University. He has also been president of the Palaeontological Association and Palaeontographical Society; Fortey also served on the councils of the Systematics Association; the Royal Society; the Palaeontographical Society (ex president); the British Mycological Society (vice president), and on the Stratigraphy Committee of the Geological Society of London; served on the editorial boards of the Terra Nova; the Palaeontographica Italiana; the Historical Biology; the Biological Proceedings of the Royal Society of London and the Biology Letters. In 2009, he was elected a Fellow of the Royal Society of Literature.

His science writing earned accolades, including the Natural World Book of the Year award for The Hidden Landscape (1994). Life: An Unauthorised Biography (1998) and Earth: An Intimate History (2005) were shortlisted for the Rhône-Poulenc Prize. Trilobite!: Eyewitness to Evolution (2001) was shortlisted the Samuel Johnson Prize. Life: an Unauthorised Biography was listed as one of ten Books of the Year by The New York Times. He won the 2003 Lewis Thomas Prize and the 2006 Michael Faraday Prize for the public communication of science.

He also turned his pen to writing dinosaur poems for children and even a spoof book on the Rubik's Cube. Fortey was appointed Officer of the Order of the British Empire (OBE) in the 2023 New Year Honours for services to palaeontology and geology.

== Books ==
- Fossils: The Key to the Past, Natural History Museum (1982, fifth edition 2015)
- The Hidden Landscape, Jonathan Cape (1993, ISBN 0-224-03651-3), Bodley Head (revised edition 2010)
- Life: An Unauthorised Biography, HarperCollins (1997, ISBN 0-00-638420-X), Folio Society edition (2008)
- Trilobite!: Eyewitness to Evolution, HarperCollins (2000, ISBN 0-00-655138-6)
- The Earth: An Intimate History, HarperCollins (2004, ISBN 0-00-655137-8), Folio Society edition (2011)
- Dry Store Room No. 1: The Secret Life of the Natural History Museum, HarperPress (2008, ISBN 978-0-00-720988-0)
- Survivors: The Animals and Plants That Time Has Left Behind, HarperCollins (2011), published as Horseshoe Crabs and Velvet Worms (2012) in the US
- The Wood for the Trees: The Long View of Nature from a Small Wood, William Collins (2016, ISBN 978-0-00-810466-5)
- A Curious Boy, William Collins (2021, ISBN 978-0-00-832396-7)

He also penned humorous titles under two pseudonyms:

- The Roderick Masters Book of Money-Making Schemes, or How to Become Enormously Wealthy with Virtually No Effort, published anonymously, Routledge & Kegan Paul (1981, ISBN 0-7100-0973-9)
- Bindweed's Bestseller, ed. Heather & David Godwin, Jackie & Richard Fortey, Pan Books (1982, ISBN 0-330-26933-X)
