= Bibliography of Alexander Hamilton =

Alexander Hamilton
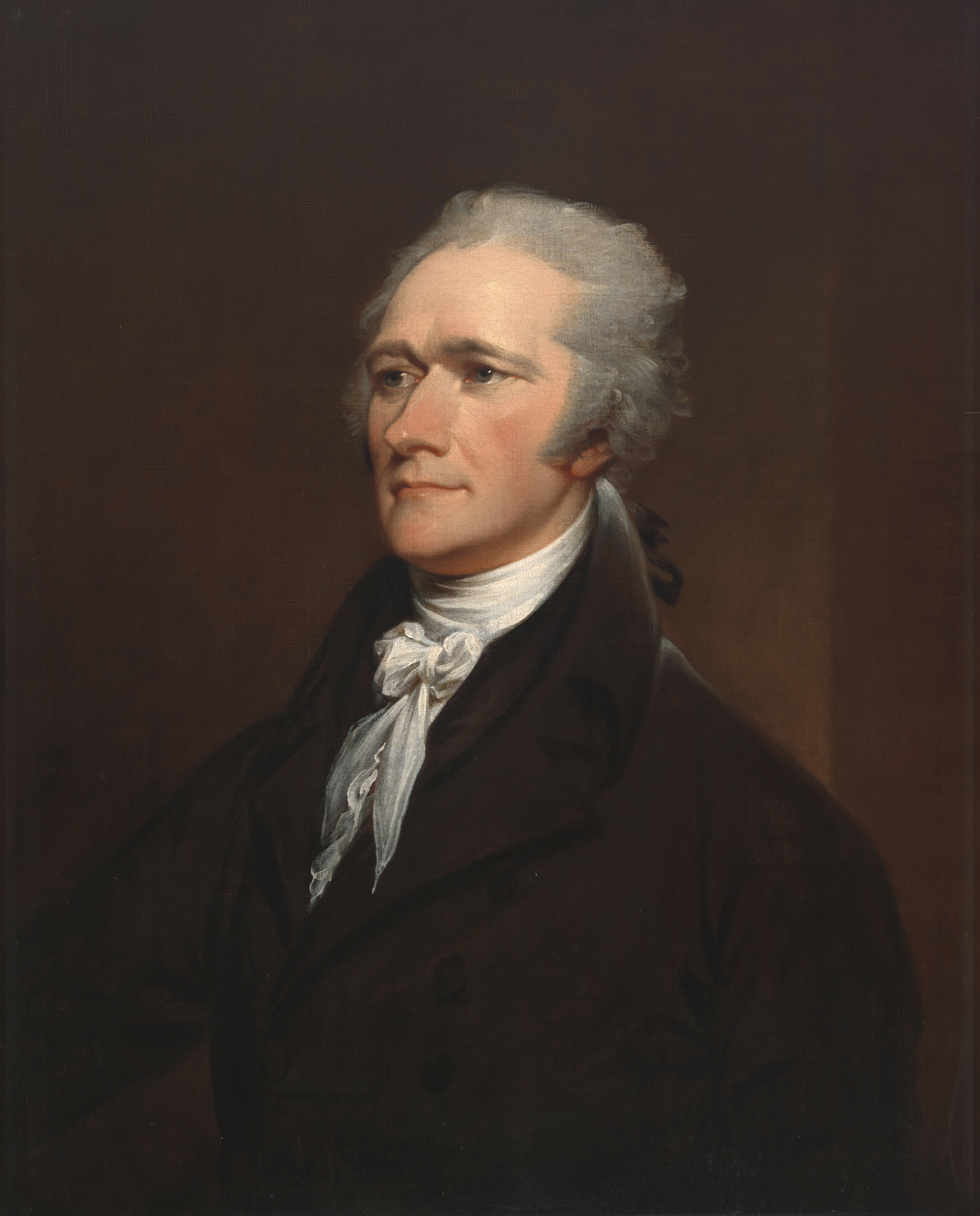
- Posthumous portrait by John Trumbull, 1806, from a life bust by Giuseppe Ceracchi, 1794

1st United States Secretary of the Treasury
- In office September 11, 1789 – January 31, 1795
- President: George Washington
- Preceded by: Office established
- Succeeded by: Oliver Wolcott Jr.

8th Senior Officer of the United States Army
- In office December 14, 1799 – June 15, 1800
- President: John Adams
- Preceded by: George Washington
- Succeeded by: James Wilkinson

Delegate to the Congress of the Confederation from New York
- In office November 3, 1788 – March 2, 1789
- Preceded by: Egbert Benson
- Succeeded by: Seat abolished
- In office November 4, 1782 – June 21, 1783
- Preceded by: Seat established
- Succeeded by: Seat abolished

Personal details
- Born: January 11, 1755 or 1757 (Note: It is unclear whether he was born in 1755 or 1757. Most historical evidence supports the idea that he was born in 1757. Hamilton celebrated his birthday on January 11. In his later life, he tended to give his age in round figures. Historians accepted 1757 as his birth year until the 1930s when additional documentation was published, including a 1768 probate paper from Saint Croix listing him as 13. Since then, some historians favored 1755. If he was born in 1757, the probate paper may have included an error or Hamilton may have given his age as thirteen to appear older and more employable. Historians have pointed out other inaccuracies in the paper, demonstrating its unreliability.) Charlestown, Nevis, British Leeward Islands
- Died: July 12, 1804 (aged 47 or 49) New York City, U.S.
- Cause of death: Gunshot wound
- Resting place: Trinity Church Cemetery
- Party: Federalist
- Spouse: Elizabeth Schuyler (m. 1780)
- Children: Philip; Angelica; Alexander; James; John; William; Eliza; Philip
- Relatives: Hamilton family
- Education: King's College; Columbia College (MA)

Military service
- Allegiance: New York (1775–1777); United States (1777–1800)
- Branch/service: New York Provincial Company of Artillery; Continental Army; United States Army
- Years of service: 1775–1776 (militia); 1776–1782; 1798–1800
- Rank: Major general
- Commands: U.S. Army Senior Officer
- Battles/wars: American Revolutionary War; Battle of Harlem Heights; Battle of White Plains; Battle of Trenton; Battle of Princeton; Battle of Brandywine; Battle of Germantown; Battle of Monmouth; Siege of Yorktown; Quasi-War

This is a bibliography of works about and principle works by Alexander Hamilton.

Alexander Hamilton (January 11, 1755, or 1757 – July 12, 1804) was an American military officer, statesman, and Founding Father who served as the first U.S. secretary of the treasury from 1789 to 1795 under the presidency of George Washington. He also founded America's first political party, the Federalist Party, in 1791.

Works listed here are cited in the notes or bibliographies of scholarly sources. Each is published by an academic or major press, written by a recognized expert, or substantially reviewed in scholarly journals; borderline cases are omitted. A selection of primary sources are included. Many of the books below carry their own bibliographies; see the Further reading section for other bibliographies, and the External links section for historical sites, academic sites, and museums.

Citations follow APA style. (Note: Entries are in plain text APA 7 format without templates; templates are used only for reviews and notes.) Book have citations to academic journal or mainstream published reviews when available. For books only partly about the subject, relevant chapter or section titles are provided when useful and available. Translators of the original-language edition are included when possible. In cases where a title or name has appeared with more than one English spelling, the most recent published form is used and a footnote documents any earlier title under which the work appeared.

== General works ==
- Brookhiser, R. (1999). Alexander Hamilton, American. Free Press.
- Chernow, R. (2004). Alexander Hamilton. Penguin Books.
- Cooke, J. E. (1982). Alexander Hamilton. Charles Scribner's Sons.
- McDonald, F. (1979). Alexander Hamilton: A biography. W. W. Norton.
- Miller, J. C. (1959). Alexander Hamilton: Portrait in paradox. Harper & Brothers.
- Mitchell, B. (1957b). Alexander Hamilton: Youth to maturity, 1755–1788. Macmillan.
- Mitchell, B. (1962). Alexander Hamilton: The national adventure, 1788–1804. Macmillan.
- Mitchell, B. (1970). Alexander Hamilton: The revolutionary years. Thomas Y. Crowell.
- Randall, W. S. (2003). Alexander Hamilton: A life. HarperCollins.

== Revolutionary America ==
=== Youth and the Caribbean years ===
- Flexner, J. T. (1978). The young Hamilton: A biography. Little, Brown.
- Larson, H. (1952). Alexander Hamilton: The fact and fiction of his early years. The William and Mary Quarterly, 9(2), 139. JSTOR 1925345
- Newton, M. E. (2015). Alexander Hamilton: The formative years. Eleftheria Publishing.
- Porwancher, A. (2021). The Jewish world of Alexander Hamilton. Princeton University Press.

=== The American revolutionary era ===
- Anderson, F. (2000). Crucible of war: The Seven Years' War and the fate of empire in British North America, 1754–1766. Alfred A. Knopf.
- Bailyn, B. (1967). The ideological origins of the American Revolution. Belknap Press of Harvard University Press.
- Ferling, J. (2003). A leap in the dark: The struggle to create the American republic. Oxford University Press.
- Greene, J. P. (1988). Pursuits of happiness: The social development of early modern British colonies and the formation of American culture. University of North Carolina Press.
- McCusker, J. J., & Menard, R. R. (1985). The economy of British America, 1607–1789. University of North Carolina Press.
- Middlekauff, R. (1982). The glorious cause: The American Revolution, 1763–1789. Oxford University Press.
- Nash, G. B. (1979). The urban crucible: Social change, political consciousness, and the origins of the American Revolution. Harvard University Press.
- Richter, D. K. (2001). Facing east from Indian country: A native history of early America. Harvard University Press.
- Taylor, A. (2016). American revolutions: A continental history, 1750–1804. W. W. Norton.
- Wood, G. S. (1969). The creation of the American republic, 1776–1787. University of North Carolina Press.
- Wood, G. S. (1992). The radicalism of the American Revolution. Alfred A. Knopf.

=== Military service, 1775–1783 ===
- Carp, E. W. (1984). To starve the army at pleasure: Continental Army administration and American political culture, 1775–1783. University of North Carolina Press.
- Cray, R. E. (1997). Major John Andre and the three captors: Class dynamics and revolutionary memory wars in the early republic, 1780–1831. Journal of the Early Republic, 17(3), 371. JSTOR 3123941
- Ferling, J. (2007). Almost a miracle: The American victory in the War of Independence. Oxford University Press.
- Kohn, R. H. (1970). The inside history of the Newburgh conspiracy: America and the coup d'etat. The William and Mary Quarterly, 27(2), 187. JSTOR 1918650
- Kohn, R. H. (1975). Eagle and sword: The Federalists and the creation of the military establishment in America, 1783–1802. Free Press.
- Lengel, E. G. (2005). General George Washington: A military life. Random House.
- Massey, G. D. (1997). The limits of antislavery thought in the revolutionary lower South: John Laurens and Henry Laurens. The Journal of Southern History, 63(3), 495. JSTOR 2211648
- Nelson, P. D. (1972). Horatio Gates at Newburgh, 1783: A misunderstood role. The William and Mary Quarterly, 29(1), 143. JSTOR 1921331
- Nelson, P. D. (1979). Citizen soldiers or regulars: The views of American general officers on the military establishment, 1775–1781. Military Affairs, 43(3), 126. JSTOR 1986871
- Royster, C. (1979). A revolutionary people at war: The Continental Army and American character, 1775–1783. University of North Carolina Press.
- Skeen, C. E., & Kohn, R. H. (1974). The Newburgh conspiracy reconsidered. The William and Mary Quarterly, 31(2), 273. JSTOR 1920913
- Walling, K.-F. (1999). Republican empire: Alexander Hamilton on war and free government. University Press of Kansas.

=== The Constitutional Convention and ratification ===
- Brooks, R. (1967). Alexander Hamilton, Melancton Smith, and the ratification of the Constitution in New York. The William and Mary Quarterly, 24(3), 339. JSTOR 1920872
- Cornell, S. (1999). The other founders: Anti-Federalism and the dissenting tradition in America, 1788–1828. University of North Carolina Press.
- Crosby, R. W. (1976). The New York State ratifying convention: On federalism. Polity, 9(1), 97–116. JSTOR 3234438
- De Pauw, L. G. (1966). The eleventh pillar: New York State and the federal Constitution. Cornell University Press.
- Ford, W. C. (1904). Alexander Hamilton's notes in the Federal Convention of 1787. The American Historical Review, 10(1), 97. JSTOR 1833816
- Maier, P. (2010). Ratification: The people debate the Constitution, 1787–1788. Simon & Schuster.
- Rakove, J. N. (1987). The great compromise: Ideas, interests, and the politics of constitution making. The William and Mary Quarterly, 44(3), 424. JSTOR 1939765
- Rakove, J. N. (1996). Original meanings: Politics and ideas in the making of the Constitution. Alfred A. Knopf.
- Richards, G. L. (1958). Alexander Hamilton's influence on John Marshall's judiciary speech in the 1788 Virginia federal ratifying convention. Quarterly Journal of Speech, 44(1), 31–39. doi:10.1080/00335635809382274
- Riker, W. H. (1991). Why negative campaigning is rational: The rhetoric of the ratification campaign of 1787–1788. Studies in American Political Development, 5(2), 224–283. doi:10.1017/S0898588X00000249

=== The Federalist Papers ===
- Adair, D. (1944). The authorship of the disputed Federalist papers: Part II. The William and Mary Quarterly, 1(3), 235. JSTOR 1923729
- Bosch, R. A., & Smith, J. A. (1998). Separating hyperplanes and the authorship of the disputed Federalist papers. The American Mathematical Monthly, 105(7), 601–608. doi:10.1080/00029890.1998.12004933
- Carey, G. W. (1984). Publius—A split personality? The Review of Politics, 46(1), 5–22. doi:10.1017/S0034670500048737
- Epstein, D. F. (1984). The political theory of The Federalist. University of Chicago Press.
- Furtwangler, A. (1984). The authority of Publius: A reading of the Federalist papers. Cornell University Press.
- Millican, E. (1990). One united people: The Federalist papers and the national idea. University Press of Kentucky.
- Miranda-García, A., & Calle-Martín, J. (2012). The authorship of the disputed Federalist papers with an annotated corpus. English Studies, 93(3), 371–390. doi:10.1080/0013838X.2012.668795
- Mosteller, F., & Wallace, D. L. (1963). Inference in an authorship problem. Journal of the American Statistical Association, 58(302), 275–309. doi:10.1080/01621459.1963.10500849
- Mosteller, F., & Wallace, D. L. (1964). Inference and disputed authorship: The Federalist. Addison-Wesley.
- Rokeach, M., Homant, R. J., & Penner, L. A. (1970). A value analysis of the disputed Federalist papers. Journal of Personality and Social Psychology, 16(2), 245–250. doi:10.1037/h0029857
- Slonim, S. (2006). Federalist No. 78 and Brutus' neglected thesis on judicial supremacy. Constitutional Commentary, 23(1), 7. doi:10.24926/26390742.2194
- Wills, G. (1981). Explaining America: The Federalist. Doubleday.
- Zvesper, J. (1984). The Madisonian systems. Western Political Quarterly, 37(2), 236–256. doi:10.1177/106591298403700204

== The Early Republic, 1789–1801 ==
=== Treasury secretary ===
- Bruchey, S. (1970). Alexander Hamilton and the state banks, 1789 to 1795. The William and Mary Quarterly, 27(3), 347. JSTOR 1919666
- Cooke, J. E. (1975). Tench Coxe, Alexander Hamilton, and the encouragement of American manufactures. The William and Mary Quarterly, 32(3), 369. JSTOR 1922130
- Cowen, D. J. (2000a). The First Bank of the United States and the securities market crash of 1792. The Journal of Economic History, 60(4), 1041–1060. doi:10.1017/s0022050700000449
- Cowen, D. J. (2000b). The origins and economic impact of the First Bank of the United States, 1791–1797. Garland.
- Curott, N. A., & White, L. H. (2024). How Adam Smith's banking views influenced Hamilton, Jefferson, and the debate over the Bank of the United States. Southern Economic Journal, 91(2), 540–559. doi:10.1002/soej.12716
- Edling, M. M. (2003). A revolution in favor of government: Origins of the U.S. Constitution and the making of the American state. Oxford University Press.
- Edling, M. M. (2014). A Hercules in the cradle: War, money, and the American state, 1783–1867. University of Chicago Press.
- Edling, M. M., & Kaplanoff, M. D. (2004). Alexander Hamilton's fiscal reform: Transforming the structure of taxation in the early republic. The William and Mary Quarterly, 61(4), 713. JSTOR 3491426
- Ferguson, E. J. (1961). The power of the purse: A history of American public finance, 1776–1790. University of North Carolina Press.
- Ferguson, E. J. (1969). The nationalists of 1781–1783 and the economic interpretation of the Constitution. The Journal of American History, 56(2), 241. JSTOR 1908122
- Frith, M. A. (2026). Alexander Hamilton, Tench Coxe, and the diversity of talents: A neglected argument in early American protectionist thought. History of Economics Review, 1–17. Advance online publication. doi:10.1080/10370196.2026.2657703
- Grubb, F. (2003). Creating the U.S. dollar currency union, 1748–1811: A quest for monetary stability or a usurpation of state sovereignty for personal gain? American Economic Review, 93(5), 1778–1798. doi:10.1257/000282803322655545
- Hacker, L. M. (1957). The Report on Manufactures. The Historian, 19(2), 144–167. doi:10.1111/j.1540-6563.1957.tb01800.x
- Hammond, B. (1957). Banks and politics in America from the Revolution to the Civil War. Princeton University Press.
- Irwin, D. A. (2004). The aftermath of Hamilton's "Report on Manufactures". The Journal of Economic History, 64(3), 800–821. doi:10.1017/s0022050704002979
- McCraw, T. K. (2012). The founders and finance. Harvard University Press.
- Meardon, S. (2013). "A reciprocity of advantages": Carey, Hamilton, and the American protective doctrine. Early American Studies, 11(3), 431–454. doi:10.1353/eam.2013.0023
- Morgan, H. W. (1956). The origins and establishment of the First Bank of the United States. Business History Review, 30(4), 472–492. JSTOR 3111717
- Nelson, J. R., Jr. (1979). Alexander Hamilton and American manufacturing: A reexamination. The Journal of American History, 65(4), 971. JSTOR 1894556
- Nelson, J. R., Jr. (1987). Liberty and property: Political economy and policymaking in the new nation, 1789–1812. Johns Hopkins University Press.
- Perkins, E. J. (1994). American public finance and financial services, 1700–1815. Ohio State University Press.
- Rousseau, P. L., & Sylla, R. (2005). Emerging financial markets and early US growth. Explorations in Economic History, 42(1), 1–26. doi:10.1016/j.eeh.2004.03.004
- Shankman, A. (2003). "A new thing on earth": Alexander Hamilton, pro-manufacturing Republicans, and the democratization of American political economy. Journal of the Early Republic, 23(3), 323. JSTOR 3595043
- Swanson, D. F., & Trout, A. P. (1990). Alexander Hamilton, "the celebrated Mr. Neckar," and public credit. The William and Mary Quarterly, 47(3), 422. JSTOR 2938096
- Swanson, D. F., & Trout, A. P. (1992a). Alexander Hamilton, conversion, and debt reduction. Explorations in Economic History, 29(4), 417–429. doi:10.1016/0014-4983(92)90003-F
- Swanson, D. F., & Trout, A. P. (1992b). Alexander Hamilton's hidden sinking fund. The William and Mary Quarterly, 49(1), 108. JSTOR 2947337
- Sylla, R., & Cowen, D. J. (2018). Alexander Hamilton on finance, credit, and debt. Columbia University Press.
- Sylla, R., Wright, R. E., & Cowen, D. J. (2009). Alexander Hamilton, central banker: Crisis management during the U.S. financial panic of 1792. Business History Review, 83(1), 61–86. doi:10.1017/s0007680500000209
- Wettereau, J. O. (1942). The branches of the First Bank of the United States. The Journal of Economic History, 2(S1), 66–100. doi:10.1017/s0022050700083443
- Wright, R. E. (2002). Hamilton unbound: Finance and the creation of the American republic. ABC-CLIO.
- Wright, R. E., & Cowen, D. J. (2006). Financial founding fathers: The men who made America rich. University of Chicago Press.

=== The Whiskey Rebellion ===
- Kohn, R. H. (1972). The Washington administration's decision to crush the Whiskey Rebellion. The Journal of American History, 59(3), 567. JSTOR 1900658

=== Foreign policy and the Jay Treaty ===
- Broadwater, J. (2021). Madison, Hamilton, and the neutrality proclamation of 1793: Debating presidential power and foreign affairs. The Historian, 83(2), 171–192. doi:10.1080/00182370.2021.1933703
- Combs, J. A. (1970). The Jay Treaty: Political battleground of the founding fathers. University of California Press.
- Estes, T. (2000). Shaping the politics of public opinion: Federalists and the Jay Treaty debate. Journal of the Early Republic, 20(3), 393. JSTOR 3125063
- Estes, T. (2006). The Jay Treaty debate, public opinion, and the evolution of early American political culture. University of Massachusetts Press.
- Harper, J. L. (2004). American Machiavelli: Alexander Hamilton and the origins of U.S. foreign policy. Cambridge University Press.
- Lycan, G. L. (1970). Alexander Hamilton and American foreign policy: A design for greatness. University of Oklahoma Press.
- Schwarz, M. (2007). The great divergence reconsidered: Hamilton, Madison, and U.S.–British relations, 1783–89. Journal of the Early Republic, 27(3), 407–436. doi:10.1353/jer.2007.0052
- Walling, K.-F. (1995). Was Alexander Hamilton a Machiavellian statesman? The Review of Politics, 57(3), 419–447. doi:10.1017/s0034670500019690

=== The Quasi-War and the Alien and Sedition Acts ===
- Bird, W. (2020). Criminal dissent: Prosecutions under the Alien and Sedition Acts of 1798. Harvard University Press.
- Coleman, A. N. (2008). "A second Bounaparty?": A reexamination of Alexander Hamilton during the Franco-American crisis, 1796–1801. Journal of the Early Republic, 28(2), 183–214. doi:10.1353/jer.0.0004
- DeConde, A. (1966). The quasi-war: The politics and diplomacy of the undeclared war with France, 1797–1801. Charles Scribner's Sons.
- Kurtz, S. G. (1957). The presidency of John Adams: The collapse of Federalism, 1795–1800. University of Pennsylvania Press.
- Kurtz, S. G. (1965). The French mission of 1799–1800: Concluding chapter in the statecraft of John Adams. Political Science Quarterly, 80(4), 543–557. JSTOR 2146998
- Murphy, W. J. (1979). John Adams: The politics of the additional army, 1798–1800. The New England Quarterly, 52(2), 234. JSTOR 364841
- Palmer, M. A. (1987). Stoddert's war: Naval operations during the Quasi-War with France, 1798–1801. University of South Carolina Press.
- Perl-Rosenthal, N. (2011). Private letters and public diplomacy: The Adams network and the Quasi-War, 1797–1798. Journal of the Early Republic, 31(2), 283–311. doi:10.1353/jer.2011.0027
- Smelser, M. (1954). George Washington and the Alien and Sedition Acts. The American Historical Review, 59(2), 322. JSTOR 1843624
- Smith, J. M. (1954a). Alexander Hamilton, the Alien Law, and seditious libels. The Review of Politics, 16(3), 305–333. doi:10.1017/s0034670500007300
- Smith, J. M. (1954b). Sedition, suppression, and speech: A comic footnote on the enforcement of the sedition law of 1798. Quarterly Journal of Speech, 40(3), 284–287. doi:10.1080/00335635409381986
- Smith, J. M. (1956). Freedom's fetters: The Alien and Sedition laws and American civil liberties. Cornell University Press.
- Stevens, J. D. (1966). Congressional history of the 1798 sedition law. Journalism Quarterly, 43(2), 247–256. doi:10.1177/107769906604300205

== Legal practice and the law ==
- Brown, K. E. (2014). Rethinking People v. Croswell: Alexander Hamilton and the nature and scope of "common law" in the early republic. Law and History Review, 32(3), 611–645. doi:10.1017/S0738248014000248
- Brown, K. E. (2017). Alexander Hamilton and the development of American law. University Press of Kansas.
- Finkelman, P. (1984). Alexander Hamilton, Esq.: Founding father as lawyer. American Bar Foundation Research Journal, 9(1), 229. doi:10.1086/492057
- Graber, M. A. (1998). Federalist or friends of Adams: The Marshall Court and party politics. Studies in American Political Development, 12(2), 229–266. doi:10.1017/s0898588x98001539
- Hoffer, P. C. (2016). Rutgers v. Waddington: Alexander Hamilton, the end of the war for independence, and the origins of judicial review. University Press of Kansas.
- Mashaw, J. L. (2006). Recovering American administrative law: Federalist foundations, 1787–1801. The Yale Law Journal, 115(6), 1256. JSTOR 20455655
- Slonim, S. (2006). Federalist No. 78 and Brutus' neglected thesis on judicial supremacy. Constitutional Commentary, 23(1), 7. doi:10.24926/26390742.2194
- Smith, J. M. (1954a). Alexander Hamilton, the Alien Law, and seditious libels. The Review of Politics, 16(3), 305–333. doi:10.1017/s0034670500007300

== Political life ==
=== Political thought ===
- Adair, D. (1974). Fame and the founding fathers (T. Colbourn, Ed.). W. W. Norton.
- Bailey, J. D. (2008). The new unitary executive and democratic theory: The problem of Alexander Hamilton. American Political Science Review, 102(4), 453–465. doi:10.1017/S0003055408080337
- Caldwell, L. K. (1944). Alexander Hamilton: Advocate of executive leadership. Public Administration Review, 4(2), 113. JSTOR 972672
- Carrington, A. M. (2017). To inform and recommend: Hamilton and the constitutional ground for interaction between executive officers and Congress. Presidential Studies Quarterly, 47(4), 624–645. doi:10.1111/psq.12395
- Chan, M. D. (2006). Aristotle and Hamilton: Commerce and statesmanship. University of Missouri Press.
- Fatovic, C. (2013). Reason and experience in Alexander Hamilton's science of politics. American Political Thought, 2(1), 1–30. doi:10.1086/666658
- Federici, M. P. (2012). The political philosophy of Alexander Hamilton. Johns Hopkins University Press.
- Koritansky, J. C. (1979). Alexander Hamilton's philosophy of government and administration. Publius: The Journal of Federalism, 9(2). doi:10.1093/oxfordjournals.pubjof.a038547
- Martin, K. J. (2025). Alexander Hamilton's theory of conscience: Conscience as a source of constitutional obligation. American Political Thought, 14(3), 356–380. doi:10.1086/736327
- McNamara, P. (1998). Political economy and statesmanship: Smith, Hamilton, and the foundation of the commercial republic. Northern Illinois University Press.
- Read, J. H. (2000). Power versus liberty: Madison, Hamilton, Wilson, and Jefferson. University Press of Virginia.
- Staloff, D. (2005). Hamilton, Adams, Jefferson: The politics of enlightenment and the American founding. Hill and Wang.
- Stourzh, G. (1970). Alexander Hamilton and the idea of republican government. Stanford University Press.
- Taylor, Q. (2016). The mask of Publius: Alexander Hamilton and the politics of expediency. American Political Thought, 5(1), 55–79. doi:10.1086/684559
- Walling, K.-F. (1995). Was Alexander Hamilton a Machiavellian statesman? The Review of Politics, 57(3), 419–447. doi:10.1017/s0034670500019690
- Walling, K.-F. (1999). Republican empire: Alexander Hamilton on war and free government. University Press of Kansas.
- Wirls, S. (2020). Alexander Hamilton and the origin of political obligation. American Political Thought, 9(4), 571–593. doi:10.1086/711069
- Wurman, I. (2023). Alexander Hamilton on executive authority. American Journal of Legal History, 63(3), 251–257. doi:10.1093/ajlh/njad005

=== Party conflict ===
- Ackerman, B., & Fontana, D. (2004). Thomas Jefferson counts himself into the presidency. Virginia Law Review, 90(2), 551. JSTOR 3202441
- Baker, T. N. (2011). "An attack well directed": Aaron Burr intrigues for the presidency. Journal of the Early Republic, 31(4), 553–598. doi:10.1353/jer.2011.0073
- Freeman, J. B. (1999). The election of 1800: A study in the logic of political change. The Yale Law Journal, 108(8), 1959. JSTOR 797378
- Murphy, B. P. (2008). "A very convenient instrument": The Manhattan Company, Aaron Burr, and the election of 1800. The William and Mary Quarterly, 65(2), 233. JSTOR 25096785
- Pasley, J. L. (2001). "The tyranny of printers": Newspaper politics in the early American republic. University Press of Virginia.
- Rohrs, R. C. (1988). The Federalist Party and the Convention of 1800. Diplomatic History, 12(3), 237–260. doi:10.1111/j.1467-7709.1988.tb00475.x
- Sharp, J. R. (1993). American politics in the early republic: The new nation in crisis. Yale University Press.
- Sharp, J. R. (2010). The deadlocked election of 1800: Jefferson, Burr, and the union in the balance. University Press of Kansas.
- Sloan, H. (2004). "In a choice of evils ... Jefferson is in every view less dangerous than Burr": Alexander Hamilton to Harrison Gray Otis on the deadlocked presidential election of 1800. OAH Magazine of History, 18(5), 53–57. doi:10.1093/maghis/18.5.53
- Stewart, D. H. (1952). The press and political corruption during the Federalist administrations. Political Science Quarterly, 67(3), 426–446. JSTOR 2145166

=== New York politics ===
- Boonshoft, M. (2012). Doughfaces at the founding: Federalists, anti-federalists, slavery, and the ratification of the Constitution in New York. New York History, 93(3), 187. JSTOR newyorkhist.93.3.187
- Brooks, R. (1967). Alexander Hamilton, Melancton Smith, and the ratification of the Constitution in New York. The William and Mary Quarterly, 24(3), 339. JSTOR 1920872
- Countryman, E. (1981). A people in revolution: The American Revolution and political society in New York, 1760–1790. Johns Hopkins University Press.
- De Pauw, L. G. (1966). The eleventh pillar: New York State and the federal Constitution. Cornell University Press.
- Gilje, P. A. (1987). The road to mobocracy: Popular disorder in New York City, 1763–1834. University of North Carolina Press.
- Kaminski, J. P. (1993). George Clinton: Yeoman politician of the new republic. Madison House.
- Murphy, B. P. (2015). Building the Empire State: Political economy in the early republic. University of Pennsylvania Press.
- Rock, H. B. (1979). Artisans of the new republic: The tradesmen of New York City in the age of Jefferson. New York University Press.
- Young, A. F. (1964). The mechanics and the Jeffersonians: New York, 1789–1801. Labor History, 5(3), 247–276. doi:10.1080/00236566408583949
- Young, A. F. (1967). The Democratic Republicans of New York: The origins, 1763–1797. University of North Carolina Press.

== Political relationships and partnerships ==
=== Jefferson and Hamilton ===
- Appleby, J. (1982). What is still American in the political philosophy of Thomas Jefferson? The William and Mary Quarterly, 39(2), 287. JSTOR 1918754
- Banning, L. (1974). Republican ideology and the triumph of the Constitution, 1789 to 1793. The William and Mary Quarterly, 31(2), 167. JSTOR 1920908
- Bowling, K. R. (1971). Dinner at Jefferson's: A note on Jacob E. Cooke's "The compromise of 1790". The William and Mary Quarterly, 28(4), 629. JSTOR 1922191
- Cooke, J. E. (1970). The compromise of 1790. The William and Mary Quarterly, 27(4), 523. JSTOR 1919703
- Elkins, S., & McKitrick, E. (1993). The age of federalism: The early American republic, 1788–1800. Oxford University Press.
- Ellis, J. J. (1997). American sphinx: The character of Thomas Jefferson. Alfred A. Knopf.
- Ferling, J. E. (2013). Jefferson and Hamilton: The rivalry that forged a nation. Bloomsbury Press.
- Freeman, J. B. (1995). Slander, poison, whispers, and fame: Jefferson's "Anas" and political gossip in the early republic. Journal of the Early Republic, 15(1), 25. JSTOR 3124382
- Holloway, C. (2015). Hamilton versus Jefferson in the Washington administration. Cambridge University Press.
- Knott, S. F. (2018). The four faces of Alexander Hamilton: Jefferson's Hamilton, Hollywood's Hamilton, Miranda's Hamilton, and the real Hamilton. American Political Thought, 7(4), 543–564. doi:10.1086/699909
- Lerner, R. (1979). Commerce and character: The Anglo-American as new-model man. The William and Mary Quarterly, 36(1), 3. JSTOR 1921978
- Onuf, P. S. (1993). The scholars' Jefferson. The William and Mary Quarterly, 50(4), 671. JSTOR 2947471
- Read, J. H. (2000). Power versus liberty: Madison, Hamilton, Wilson, and Jefferson. University Press of Virginia.
- Risjord, N. K. (1976). The compromise of 1790: New evidence on the dinner table bargain. The William and Mary Quarterly, 33(2), 309. JSTOR 1922168
- Shalhope, R. E. (1972). Toward a republican synthesis: The emergence of an understanding of republicanism in American historiography. The William and Mary Quarterly, 29(1), 49. JSTOR 1921327
- Shankman, A. (2017). Original intents: Hamilton, Jefferson, Madison, and the American founding. Oxford University Press.
- Staloff, D. (2005). Hamilton, Adams, Jefferson: The politics of enlightenment and the American founding. Hill and Wang.

=== Aaron Burr and Hamilton ===
- Ackerman, B., & Fontana, D. (2004). Thomas Jefferson counts himself into the presidency. Virginia Law Review, 90(2), 551. JSTOR 3202441
- Baker, T. N. (2011). "An attack well directed": Aaron Burr intrigues for the presidency. Journal of the Early Republic, 31(4), 553–598. doi:10.1353/jer.2011.0073
- Fleming, T. J. (1999). Duel: Alexander Hamilton, Aaron Burr, and the future of America. Basic Books.
- Freeman, J. B. (1996). Dueling as politics: Reinterpreting the Burr–Hamilton duel. The William and Mary Quarterly, 53(2), 289. JSTOR 2947402
- Freeman, J. B. (1999). The election of 1800: A study in the logic of political change. The Yale Law Journal, 108(8), 1959. JSTOR 797378
- Freeman, J. B. (2001). Affairs of honor: National politics in the new republic. Yale University Press.
- Isenberg, N. (2007). Fallen founder: The life of Aaron Burr. Viking.
- Kennedy, R. G. (1999). Burr, Hamilton, and Jefferson: A study in character. Oxford University Press.
- Murphy, B. P. (2008). "A very convenient instrument": The Manhattan Company, Aaron Burr, and the election of 1800. The William and Mary Quarterly, 65(2), 233. JSTOR 25096785
- Newmyer, R. K. (2012). The treason trial of Aaron Burr. Cambridge University Press.
- Rogow, A. A. (1998). A fatal friendship: Alexander Hamilton and Aaron Burr. Hill and Wang.
- Rorabaugh, W. J. (1995). The political duel in the early republic: Burr v. Hamilton. Journal of the Early Republic, 15(1), 1. JSTOR 3124381
- Sharp, J. R. (2010). The deadlocked election of 1800: Jefferson, Burr, and the union in the balance. University Press of Kansas.
- Sloan, H. (2004). "In a choice of evils ... Jefferson is in every view less dangerous than Burr": Alexander Hamilton to Harrison Gray Otis on the deadlocked presidential election of 1800. OAH Magazine of History, 18(5), 53–57. doi:10.1093/maghis/18.5.53

=== Washington and Hamilton ===
- Broadwater, J. (2021). Madison, Hamilton, and the neutrality proclamation of 1793: Debating presidential power and foreign affairs. The Historian, 83(2), 171–192. doi:10.1080/00182370.2021.1933703
- Chernow, R. (2010). Washington: A life. Penguin Press.
- Chervinsky, L. M. (2017). The historical presidency: George Washington and the first presidential cabinet. Presidential Studies Quarterly, 48(1), 139–152. doi:10.1111/psq.12387
- Chervinsky, L. M. (2020). The cabinet: George Washington and the creation of an American institution. Harvard University Press.
- Ellis, J. J. (2004). His Excellency: George Washington. Alfred A. Knopf.
- Knott, S. F., & Williams, T. (2015). Washington and Hamilton: The alliance that forged America. Sourcebooks.
- Leibiger, S. (1999). Founding friendship: George Washington, James Madison, and the creation of the American republic. University Press of Virginia.
- Lengel, E. G. (2005). General George Washington: A military life. Random House.
- Malanson, J. J. (2014). "If I had it in his hand-writing I would burn it": Federalists and the authorship controversy over George Washington's Farewell Address, 1808–1859. Journal of the Early Republic, 34(2), 219–242. doi:10.1353/jer.2014.0031
- Pessen, E. (1987). George Washington's Farewell Address, the Cold War, and the timeless national interest. Journal of the Early Republic, 7(1), 1. JSTOR 3123426
- Spalding, M., & Garrity, P. J. (1996). A sacred union of citizens: George Washington's Farewell Address and the American character. Rowman & Littlefield.

=== The Federalist leaders and Hamilton ===
- Banning, L. (1995). The sacred fire of liberty: James Madison and the founding of the federal republic. Cornell University Press.
- Ferling, J. (1992). John Adams: A life. University of Tennessee Press.
- Leibiger, S. (1999). Founding friendship: George Washington, James Madison, and the creation of the American republic. University Press of Virginia.
- Rakove, J. N. (1990). James Madison and the creation of the American republic. Scott, Foresman.

== Slavery and race ==
- Boonshoft, M. (2012). Doughfaces at the founding: Federalists, anti-federalists, slavery, and the ratification of the Constitution in New York. New York History, 93(3), 187. JSTOR newyorkhist.93.3.187
- Chan, M. D. (2004). Alexander Hamilton on slavery. The Review of Politics, 66(2), 207–231. doi:10.1017/s003467050003727x
- Egerton, D. R. (2009). Death or liberty: African Americans and revolutionary America. Oxford University Press.
- Gellman, D. N. (2006). Emancipating New York: The politics of slavery and freedom, 1777–1827. Louisiana State University Press.
- Massey, G. D. (1997). The limits of antislavery thought in the revolutionary lower South: John Laurens and Henry Laurens. The Journal of Southern History, 63(3), 495. JSTOR 2211648
- Nathans, H. S. (2017). Crooked histories: Re-presenting race, slavery, and Alexander Hamilton onstage. Journal of the Early Republic, 37(2), 271–278. doi:10.1353/jer.2017.0022
- Scherr, A. (2021). Alexander Hamilton and slavery: A closer look at the founder. The Historian, 83(2), 130–170. doi:10.1080/00182370.2021.1933693

== Private life and religion ==
- Adair, D. (1957a). Chancellor Kent's "Brief review of the public life and writings of General Hamilton". The Historian, 19(2), 182–202. doi:10.1111/j.1540-6563.1957.tb01802.x
- Adair, D., & Harvey, M. (1955). Was Alexander Hamilton a Christian statesman? The William and Mary Quarterly, 12(2), 308. JSTOR 1920511
- Ambrose, D., & Martin, R. W. T. (Eds.). (2006). The many faces of Alexander Hamilton: The life and legacy of America's most elusive founding father. New York University Press.
- Cogan, J. K. (1996). The Reynolds affair and the politics of character. Journal of the Early Republic, 16(3), 389. JSTOR 3124057
- Govan, T. P. (1975). Alexander Hamilton and Julius Caesar: A note on the use of historical evidence. The William and Mary Quarterly, 32(3), 475. JSTOR 1922135
- Hamilton, C. V. (2010). The erotic charisma of Alexander Hamilton. Journal of American Studies, 45(1), 1–19. doi:10.1017/s0021875810000629
- Hudson, H. H. (1942). The rhetoric of Alexander Hamilton. American Speech, 17(1), 56. JSTOR 486860
- Hunt, R. C. D. (1957). A memorial to Alexander Hamilton. The Historian, 19(2), 129–131. doi:10.1111/j.1540-6563.1957.tb01798.x
- Mitchell, B. (1957a). Alexander Hamilton, his friends and foes. The Historian, 19(2), 132–143. doi:10.1111/j.1540-6563.1957.tb01799.x
- Schachner, N. (1947). Alexander Hamilton viewed by his friends: The narratives of Robert Troup and Hercules Mulligan. The William and Mary Quarterly, 4(2), 203. JSTOR 1915991

== Background and context ==
- Bailyn, B. (2005). Atlantic history: Concept and contours. Harvard University Press.
- Brown, V. (2008). The reaper's garden: Death and power in the world of Atlantic slavery. Harvard University Press.
- Burnard, T. (2004). Mastery, tyranny, and desire: Thomas Thistlewood and his slaves in the Anglo-Jamaican world. University of North Carolina Press.
- Burnard, T., & Garrigus, J. (2016). The plantation machine: Atlantic capitalism in French Saint-Domingue and British Jamaica. University of Pennsylvania Press.
- Dunn, R. S. (1972). Sugar and slaves: The rise of the planter class in the English West Indies, 1624–1713. University of North Carolina Press.
- Elliott, J. H. (2006). Empires of the Atlantic world: Britain and Spain in America, 1492–1830. Yale University Press.
- Goveia, E. V. (1965). Slave society in the British Leeward Islands at the end of the eighteenth century. Yale University Press.
- Hancock, D. (1995). Citizens of the world: London merchants and the integration of the British Atlantic community, 1735–1785. Cambridge University Press.
- Matson, C. (1998). Merchants and empire: Trading in colonial New York. Johns Hopkins University Press.
- Mulcahy, M. (2006). Hurricanes and society in the British Greater Caribbean, 1624–1783. Johns Hopkins University Press.
- O'Shaughnessy, A. J. (2000). An empire divided: The American Revolution and the British Caribbean. University of Pennsylvania Press.
- Pares, R. (1936). War and trade in the West Indies, 1739–1763. Clarendon Press.
- Pares, R. (1956). Yankees and Creoles: The trade between North America and the West Indies before the American Revolution. Harvard University Press.
- Ragatz, L. J. (1928). The fall of the planter class in the British Caribbean, 1763–1833: A study in social and economic history. Century Co.
- Sheridan, R. B. (1974). Sugar and slavery: An economic history of the British West Indies, 1623–1775. Johns Hopkins University Press.
- Truxes, T. M. (2008). Defying empire: Trading with the enemy in colonial New York. Yale University Press.

== Hamilton in popular culture ==
- Dwyer, J. A. (2014). Remembering Alexander Hamilton: The political impact of street theatre in the early republic. New York History, 95(2), 223–242. doi:10.1353/nyh.2014.0033
- Kelly, C. E. (2017). Introduction: Lin-Manuel Miranda's Hamilton: An American Musical and the early American republic. Journal of the Early Republic, 37(2), 251–253. doi:10.1353/jer.2017.0020
- Knott, S. F. (2018). The four faces of Alexander Hamilton: Jefferson's Hamilton, Hollywood's Hamilton, Miranda's Hamilton, and the real Hamilton. American Political Thought, 7(4), 543–564. doi:10.1086/699909
- Monteiro, L. D. (2016). Review essay: Race-conscious casting and the erasure of the Black past in Lin-Manuel Miranda's Hamilton. The Public Historian, 38(1), 89–98. doi:10.1525/tph.2016.38.1.89
- Nathans, H. S. (2017). Crooked histories: Re-presenting race, slavery, and Alexander Hamilton onstage. Journal of the Early Republic, 37(2), 271–278. doi:10.1353/jer.2017.0022
- Potter, A. M. (2023). 1776 and Hamilton: Comparing "founding" histories in musical theatre. European Journal of American Studies, 18(1). doi:10.4000/ejas.19309
- Romano, R. C., & Potter, C. B. (Eds.). (2018). Historians on Hamilton: How a blockbuster musical is restaging America's past. Rutgers University Press.
- Schocket, A. M. (2017). The American Revolution rebooted: Hamilton and genre in contemporary culture. Journal of the Early Republic, 37(2), 263–269. doi:10.1353/jer.2017.0023
- Snyder, J. K. (2021). Teaching Hamilton: From Broadway to the classroom. The Historian, 83(2), 193–205. doi:10.1080/00182370.2021.1970460

== Historiography and legacy ==
- Ben-Atar, D. S., & Oberg, B. B. (Eds.). (1998). Federalists reconsidered. University Press of Virginia.
- Elkins, S., & McKitrick, E. (1993). The age of federalism: The early American republic, 1788–1800. Oxford University Press.
- Fair, J. D. (1999). F. S. Oliver, Alexander Hamilton, and the "American plan" for resolving Britain's constitutional crises, 1903–1921. Twentieth Century British History, 10(1), 1–26. doi:10.1093/tcbh/10.1.1
- Freeman, J. B. (2017). Will the real Alexander Hamilton please stand up? Journal of the Early Republic, 37(2), 255–262. doi:10.1353/jer.2017.0021
- Kirkwood, P. M. (2019). Alexander Hamilton and the early republic in Edwardian imperial thought. Britain and the World, 12(1), 28–50. doi:10.3366/brw.2019.0311
- Knott, S. F. (2002). Alexander Hamilton and the persistence of myth. University Press of Kansas.
- Knott, S. F. (2018). The four faces of Alexander Hamilton: Jefferson's Hamilton, Hollywood's Hamilton, Miranda's Hamilton, and the real Hamilton. American Political Thought, 7(4), 543–564. doi:10.1086/699909
- Martin, J. K. (1983). Beyond the good guys-bad guys syndrome: Will the real Alexander Hamilton please stand up? Reviews in American History, 11(1), 51. JSTOR 2701873
- McAllister, M. (2017). Toward a more perfect Hamilton. Journal of the Early Republic, 37(2), 279–288. doi:10.1353/jer.2017.0024
- Onuf, P. S. (1993). The scholars' Jefferson. The William and Mary Quarterly, 50(4), 671. JSTOR 2947471
- Shalhope, R. E. (1972). Toward a republican synthesis: The emergence of an understanding of republicanism in American historiography. The William and Mary Quarterly, 29(1), 49. JSTOR 1921327
- Sharp, J. R. (1993). American politics in the early republic: The new nation in crisis. Yale University Press.
- Syrett, H. C., & Cooke, J. E. (1957). The papers of Alexander Hamilton. The Historian, 19(2), 168–181. doi:10.1111/j.1540-6563.1957.tb01801.x
- Trees, A. S. (2005). The importance of being Alexander Hamilton. Reviews in American History, 33(1), 8–14. doi:10.1353/rah.2005.0019
- Wood, G. S. (2009). Empire of liberty: A history of the early republic, 1789–1815. Oxford University Press.

== Hamilton's writings and archives ==
=== Collected editions of Hamilton's works ===
- Hamilton, A., Madison, J., & Jay, J. (1788). The Federalist: A collection of essays, written in favour of the new Constitution, as agreed upon by the Federal Convention, September 17, 1787 (Vols. 1–2). J. and A. M'Lean. The book edition, carrying Hamilton's own revisions; Nos. 78 and 84 appeared here before they appeared in any newspaper. The linked scan is volume one; volume two is a separate Internet Archive item.
- Hamilton, A. (1851). The works of Alexander Hamilton, comprising his correspondence, and his political and official writings, exclusive of the Federalist, civil and military (J. C. Hamilton, Ed.; Vols. 1–7). C. S. Francis. The first collected edition, assembled by Hamilton's son John Church Hamilton. Full-view scans of all seven volumes.
- Hamilton, A. (1904). The works of Alexander Hamilton (Federal ed.) (H. C. Lodge, Ed.; Vols. 1–12). G. P. Putnam's Sons. The standard edition before Syrett, free in full text at the Online Library of Liberty.
- Hamilton, A. (1957). Alexander Hamilton and the founding of the nation (R. B. Morris, Ed.). Dial Press.
- Hamilton, A. (1961). The papers of Alexander Hamilton (H. C. Syrett, Ed.; Vols. 1–27, 1961–1987). Columbia University Press. The scholarly edition of record, covering 1768 to 1804 and digitised in full at Founders Online.
- Hamilton, A., Madison, J., & Jay, J. (1961). The Federalist (J. E. Cooke, Ed.). Wesleyan University Press.
- Hamilton, A. (1964). The law practice of Alexander Hamilton: Documents and commentary (J. Goebel Jr., Ed., Vols. 1–2; J. Goebel Jr. & J. H. Smith, Eds., Vols. 3–5). Columbia University Press. Hamilton's legal papers, which the Syrett edition excludes. No full text online.
- Hamilton, A. (2001). Alexander Hamilton: Writings (J. B. Freeman, Ed.). Library of America. One-volume selection of 1,108 pages, including all fifty-one of Hamilton's Federalist essays and the Reynolds pamphlet.
- Hamilton, A. (n.d.). Alexander Hamilton papers: Legal file, 1708–1804; Rutgers v. Waddington [Manuscript]. Library of Congress. Papers from his 1784 defence of a Loyalist merchant against the Trespass Act, an early argument that a state law repugnant to a treaty could not stand.

=== Other collections ===
- Bailyn, B. (Ed.). (1993). The debate on the Constitution: Federalist and Antifederalist speeches, articles, and letters during the struggle over ratification (Vols. 1–2). Library of America.
- Farrand, M. (Ed.). (1911). The records of the Federal Convention of 1787 (Vols. 1–3). Yale University Press.
- Jensen, M., Kaminski, J. P., & Saladino, G. J. (Eds.). (1976–present). The documentary history of the ratification of the Constitution. State Historical Society of Wisconsin.

=== Digital archives ===
- Hamilton, A., Madison, J., & Jay, J. (2001). The Federalist (Gideon ed.) (G. W. Carey & J. McClellan, Eds.). Liberty Fund. Modern critical edition of the Gideon text, free to read and download.
- Hamilton, A., Madison, J., & Jay, J. (n.d.). The Federalist Papers [Full text]. Avalon Project, Yale Law School. Index to all eighty-five essays; each essay page carries an authorship byline, the twelve disputed papers marked "Hamilton or Madison".
- Hamilton, A., Madison, J., & Jay, J. (n.d.). The Federalist Papers [Ebook No. 18]. Project Gutenberg. Downloadable full text in several formats.
- Library of Congress. (n.d.). Full text of the Federalist papers [Research guide]. Tabulates all eighty-five essays by number, title, author, and place of first publication.
- Library of Congress. (n.d.). Alexander Hamilton papers, 1708–1917 [Digital collection]. Manuscript Division. Roughly 12,000 items, the bulk dating 1777–1804, digitised from the original manuscripts.
- National Archives. (n.d.). About the papers of Alexander Hamilton [Founders Online]. Free searchable text of the Syrett edition, with the documents addressed to Hamilton alongside his own.

=== Individual documents ===
- Hamilton, A. (1769, November 11). Alexander Hamilton to Edward Stevens [Letter]. Founders Online, National Archives. Written from St. Croix while Hamilton was a merchant's clerk in his early teens. The earliest surviving Hamilton letter, and the source of the line "I wish there was a War."
- Hamilton, A. (1772, September 6). Alexander Hamilton to the Royal Danish American Gazette [Letter]. Founders Online, National Archives. His account of the hurricane that struck St. Croix on the night of 31 August 1772.
- Hamilton, A. (1774, December 15). A full vindication of the measures of the Congress, &c. [Pamphlet]. Founders Online, National Archives. His first political pamphlet, answering Samuel Seabury's Free Thoughts in defence of the Continental Association.
- Hamilton, A. (1775, February 23). The farmer refuted, &c. [Pamphlet]. Founders Online, National Archives. The much longer sequel to the Full vindication, arguing colonial rights from natural law rather than from charter.
- Hamilton, A. (1775, June 15). Remarks on the Quebec Bill: Part one [Essay]. Founders Online, National Archives. Attack on the Quebec Act as a precedent for arbitrary government; Part two followed on 22 June 1775.
- Hamilton, A. (1778, October 16). Publius letter, I [Essay]. Founders Online, National Archives. First of three letters attacking Samuel Chase for speculating on inside knowledge of army contracts. Letter II and letter III followed in October and November.
- Hamilton, A. (1779, March 14). Alexander Hamilton to John Jay [Letter]. Founders Online, National Archives. Supporting John Laurens's plan to raise battalions of enslaved men in South Carolina in exchange for their freedom.
- Hamilton, A. (1779, September 11). Alexander Hamilton to Lieutenant Colonel John Laurens [Letter]. Founders Online, National Archives. One of the intimate wartime letters to Laurens that have drawn sustained biographical attention.
- Hamilton, A. (1780, September 3). Alexander Hamilton to James Duane [Letter]. Founders Online, National Archives. A long diagnosis of the Confederation's weakness, calling for a convention and a national bank. The first full statement of his constitutional programme.
- Hamilton, A. (1780, October 5). Alexander Hamilton to Elizabeth Schuyler [Letter]. Founders Online, National Archives. One of the courtship letters written from camp at Tappan two months before their marriage.
- Hamilton, A. (1781, February 18). Alexander Hamilton to Philip Schuyler [Letter]. Founders Online, National Archives. His own account of the quarrel that ended his service as Washington's aide-de-camp.
- Hamilton, A. (1781, April 30). From Alexander Hamilton to Robert Morris [Letter]. Founders Online, National Archives. A detailed plan for a national bank and for funding the debt, sent to the new Superintendent of Finance.
- Hamilton, A. (1781, July 12). The Continentalist no. I [Essay]. Founders Online, National Archives. First of six essays urging that Congress be given real power, including a revenue of its own. The series ran to no. VI on 4 July 1782.
- Hamilton, A. (1783, February 13). From Alexander Hamilton to George Washington [Letter]. Founders Online, National Archives. Written as the Newburgh agitation gathered, proposing that army discontent be steered toward funding the debt.
- Hamilton, A. (1783, June 18). Continental Congress report on a military peace establishment [Report]. Founders Online, National Archives. His plan for a small standing army and a national militia. The committee declined to recommend a military academy, holding that "military knowlege is best acquired in service".
- Hamilton, A. (1784, January). A letter from Phocion to the considerate citizens of New York [Pamphlet]. Founders Online, National Archives. Against the confiscation of Loyalist property and the disfranchisement of Loyalists, on treaty and due-process grounds.
- Hamilton, A. (1784, April). Second letter from Phocion [Pamphlet]. Founders Online, National Archives. Reply to the answers provoked by the first letter.
- Hamilton, A. (1786, September 14). Address of the Annapolis Convention [Report]. Founders Online, National Archives. Drafted by Hamilton, this is the call that produced the Philadelphia Convention of 1787.
- Hamilton, A. (1787, February 15). New York Assembly. Remarks on an act granting to Congress certain imposts and duties [Speech]. Founders Online, National Archives. His argument in the New York Assembly for granting Congress an impost, which the Assembly refused.
- Hamilton, A. (1787, June 18). Constitutional Convention. Plan of government [Speech notes]. Founders Online, National Archives. The written plan accompanying his six-hour speech. The speech survives only in five versions, Hamilton's own notes and those taken by Madison, Yates, Lansing and King, introduced here.
- Hamilton, A. (1787, September 17–30). Conjectures about the new Constitution [Memorandum]. Founders Online, National Archives. A private forecast, written in the fortnight after the Convention rose, of what would follow adoption or rejection.
- Hamilton, A. (1787, October 27). The Federalist no. 1 [Essay]. Founders Online, National Archives. The general introduction to the series, published in the Independent Journal. Also at the Avalon Project.
- Hamilton, A. (1787, November 14). The Federalist no. 6 [Essay]. Founders Online, National Archives. On the danger of war between separate American confederacies. Also at the Avalon Project.
- Hamilton, A. (1787, December 1). The Federalist no. 15 [Essay]. Founders Online, National Archives. The indictment of the Confederation as a government over governments rather than over individuals. Also at the Avalon Project.
- Hamilton, A. (1787, December 18). The Federalist no. 23 [Essay]. Founders Online, National Archives. The case for unlimited federal power over the common defence. Also at the Avalon Project.
- Hamilton, A. (1788, March 12). The Federalist no. 68 [Essay]. Founders Online, National Archives. On the mode of electing the president, the essay most often quoted on the electoral college. Also at the Avalon Project.
- Hamilton, A. (1788, March 15). The Federalist no. 70 [Essay]. Founders Online, National Archives. "Energy in the executive," the classic argument for a single rather than plural president. Also at the Avalon Project.
- Hamilton, A. (1788, May 28). The Federalist no. 78 [Essay]. Founders Online, National Archives. The judiciary as the least dangerous branch, and the foundational statement of judicial review. First published in the McLean book edition. Also at the Avalon Project.
- Hamilton, A. (1788, May 28). The Federalist no. 84 [Essay]. Founders Online, National Archives. The argument that a bill of rights was unnecessary and might be dangerous. First published in the McLean book edition. Also at the Avalon Project.
- Hamilton, A. (1788, June 20). New York Ratifying Convention. Remarks (Francis Childs's version) [Speech]. Founders Online, National Archives. The first of his reported speeches at Poughkeepsie, where ratification passed by three votes. Series introduction here.
- Hamilton, A. (1790, January 9). Report relative to a provision for the support of public credit [Report]. Founders Online, National Archives. The First Report on Public Credit, proposing funding of the domestic debt at par and federal assumption of state debts.
- Hamilton, A. (1790, December 13). Final version of the second report on the further provision necessary for establishing public credit (report on a national bank) [Report]. Founders Online, National Archives. The blueprint for the Bank of the United States.
- Hamilton, A. (1791, January 28). Final version of the report on the establishment of a mint [Report]. Founders Online, National Archives. Proposed the bimetallic dollar and the decimal coinage adopted in the Coinage Act of 1792.
- Hamilton, A. (1791, February 23). Final version of an opinion on the constitutionality of an act to establish a bank [Opinion]. Founders Online, National Archives. The classic statement of implied powers and broad construction, written against Jefferson's and Randolph's opinions.
- Hamilton, A. (1791, December 5). Alexander Hamilton's final version of the report on the subject of manufactures [Report]. Founders Online, National Archives. The case for bounties, tariffs, and state encouragement of industry; the least successful of the reports in its own day and the most cited since.
- Hamilton, A. (1792, March 5). Report on the difficulties in the execution of the act laying duties on distilled spirits [Report]. Founders Online, National Archives. On resistance to the whiskey excise, two years before the rising in western Pennsylvania.
- Hamilton, A. (1792, May 26). Alexander Hamilton to Edward Carrington [Letter]. Founders Online, National Archives. The fullest private account of his break with Jefferson and Madison, and of how he read their opposition.
- Hamilton, A. (1792, August 4). An American no. I [Essay]. Founders Online, National Archives. His first public attack on Jefferson, over the subsidising of Philip Freneau's National Gazette.
- Hamilton, A. (1792, August 18). Enclosure: [Objections and answers respecting the administration] [Memorandum]. Founders Online, National Archives. Point-by-point reply to the twenty-one objections Washington had gathered on his southern tour and sent him in July, enclosed in a letter of the same date.
- Hamilton, A. (1792, September 15). Catullus no. I [Essay]. Founders Online, National Archives. First of six essays continuing the newspaper campaign against Jefferson, through to no. VI in December.
- Hamilton, A. (1792, November 30). Report on the redemption of the public debt [Report]. Founders Online, National Archives.
- Hamilton, A. (1793, April 19). Cabinet meeting. Opinion on a proclamation of neutrality and on receiving the French minister [Opinion]. Founders Online, National Archives. The cabinet argument behind the Neutrality Proclamation.
- Hamilton, A. (1793, June 29). Pacificus no. I [Essay]. Founders Online, National Archives. First of seven essays defending the Neutrality Proclamation and a broad reading of executive power, answered by Madison as "Helvidius".
- Hamilton, A. (1794, January 31). Americanus no. I [Essay]. Founders Online, National Archives. Against the argument that gratitude or ideology obliged the United States to join France.
- Hamilton, A. (1794, March 18). Report on the receipts and expenditures of the United States from the commencement of the present government to the end of the year 1793 [Report]. Founders Online, National Archives. Prepared for the select committee appointed to examine the Treasury, not as a routine annual report.
- Hamilton, A. (1794, August 23). Tully no. I [Essay]. Founders Online, National Archives. First of four letters urging obedience to the excise laws during the Whiskey Insurrection.
- Hamilton, A. (1795, January 16). Report on a plan for the further support of public credit [Report]. Founders Online, National Archives. His valedictory report as Secretary, submitted days before he left office.
- Hamilton, A. (1795, July). The defence of the funding system [Essay]. Founders Online, National Archives. An unpublished retrospective defence of the whole financial programme, written after he returned to private life.
- Hamilton, A. (1795, July 22). The defence no. I [Essay]. Founders Online, National Archives. First of thirty-eight "Camillus" essays defending the Jay Treaty. Hamilton wrote twenty-eight of them; Rufus King wrote nos. XXIII–XXX and XXXIV–XXXV, which Hamilton edited.
- Hamilton, A. (1796, June 19–20). Alexander Hamilton to Angelica Church [Letter]. Founders Online, National Archives. To his sister-in-law in London, in the teasing register that characterises the correspondence.
- Hamilton, A. (1796, July 30). Enclosure: Draft of Washington's farewell address [Draft]. Founders Online, National Archives. Hamilton's draft of the address Washington published that September.
- Hamilton, A. (1797, July). Printed version of the "Reynolds pamphlet" [Pamphlet]. Founders Online, National Archives. Published as Observations on certain documents contained in No. V & VI of "The history of the United States for the year 1796". Hamilton confessed the affair with Maria Reynolds to refute the charge of speculating in public funds.
- Hamilton, A. (1798, March 30). The stand no. I [Essay]. Founders Online, National Archives. First of seven essays signed "Titus Manlius", written for war with France during the XYZ crisis.
- Hamilton, A. (1799, January 24). Alexander Hamilton to James McHenry [Letter]. Founders Online, National Archives. Written as inspector general, on organising the new army raised for the war scare with France.
- Hamilton, A. (1800, October 24). Letter from Alexander Hamilton, concerning the public conduct and character of John Adams, Esq. President of the United States [Pamphlet]. Founders Online, National Archives. Intended for Federalist electors, it leaked, and did as much damage to Hamilton as to Adams.
- Hamilton, A. (1801, January 16). Alexander Hamilton to James A. Bayard [Letter]. Founders Online, National Archives. Urging Federalists to break the Jefferson–Burr deadlock in Jefferson's favour.
- Hamilton, A. (1801, March 21). An address to the electors of the state of New-York [Pamphlet]. Founders Online, National Archives. Issued over thirty-one Federalist signatures, Hamilton's own name not among them.
- Hamilton, A. (1801, December 17). The examination number I [Essay]. Founders Online, National Archives. First of eighteen essays signed "Lucius Crassus" dissecting Jefferson's first annual message, concluding 8 April 1802.
- Hamilton, A. (1802, February 29). Alexander Hamilton to Gouverneur Morris [Letter]. Founders Online, National Archives. Contains the much-quoted line, "Every day proves to me more and more that this American world was not made for me."
- Hamilton, A. (1802, December 29). Alexander Hamilton to Charles Cotesworth Pinckney [Letter]. Founders Online, National Archives. Written from the Grange: "A garden, you know, is a very usual refuge of a disappointed politician."
- Hamilton, A. (1803, March 20). Alexander Hamilton to Elizabeth Hamilton [Letter]. Founders Online, National Archives. A domestic letter from the Grange in his years out of office.
- Hamilton, A. (1804). People v. Croswell, 3 Johns. Cas. 337 (N.Y. 1804) [Argument]. In P. B. Kurland & R. Lerner (Eds.), The Founders' Constitution (Vol. 5). University of Chicago Press. His argument that truth may be given in evidence in a libel prosecution and that the jury may judge the law, later written into New York statute.
- Hamilton, A. (1804, June 20). Alexander Hamilton to Aaron Burr [Letter]. Founders Online, National Archives. His refusal to make the avowal Burr demanded, answering Burr's letter of 18 June and opening the exchange that led to Weehawken.
- Hamilton, A. (1804, June 28). Statement on impending duel with Aaron Burr [Memorandum]. Founders Online, National Archives. Written between 28 June and 10 July, explaining why he would meet Burr and why he intended to withhold his fire.
- Hamilton, A. (1804, July 4). Alexander Hamilton to Elizabeth Hamilton [Letter]. Founders Online, National Archives. The first farewell letter, to be delivered only if he were killed.
- Hamilton, A. (1804, July 10). Alexander Hamilton to Elizabeth Hamilton [Letter]. Founders Online, National Archives. The second farewell letter, written the night before the duel.
- Hamilton, A. (1804, July 10). From Alexander Hamilton to Theodore Sedgwick [Letter]. Founders Online, National Archives. His last political letter, written hours before Weehawken, on "our real Disease; which is Democracy".

== See also ==
- Bibliography of George Washington
- Bibliography of John Adams
- Bibliography of Thomas Jefferson
- Bibliography of the American Revolutionary War
