= Trash and Vaudeville =

Punk rock store in New York City

Coordinates: 40°43′36″N 73°59′7″W

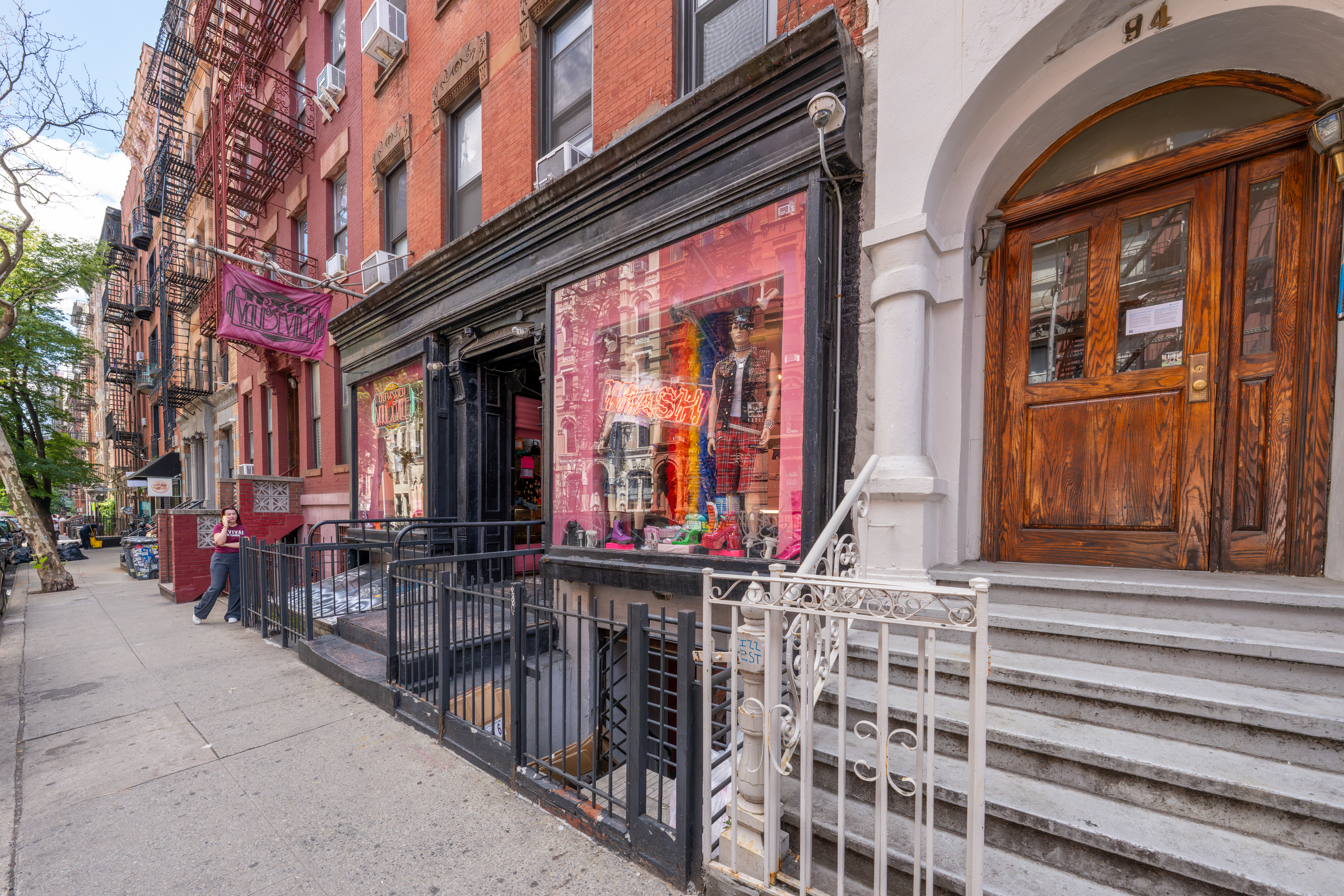
- 96 East 7th Street (2026)
- Type: Retail store
- Founded: 1975
- Founder: Ray Goodman
- Headquarters: East Village, Manhattan, U.S.
- Number of locations: 96 East 7th Street, New York, New York
- Products: Punk rock clothing and accessories
- Website: trashandvaudeville.com

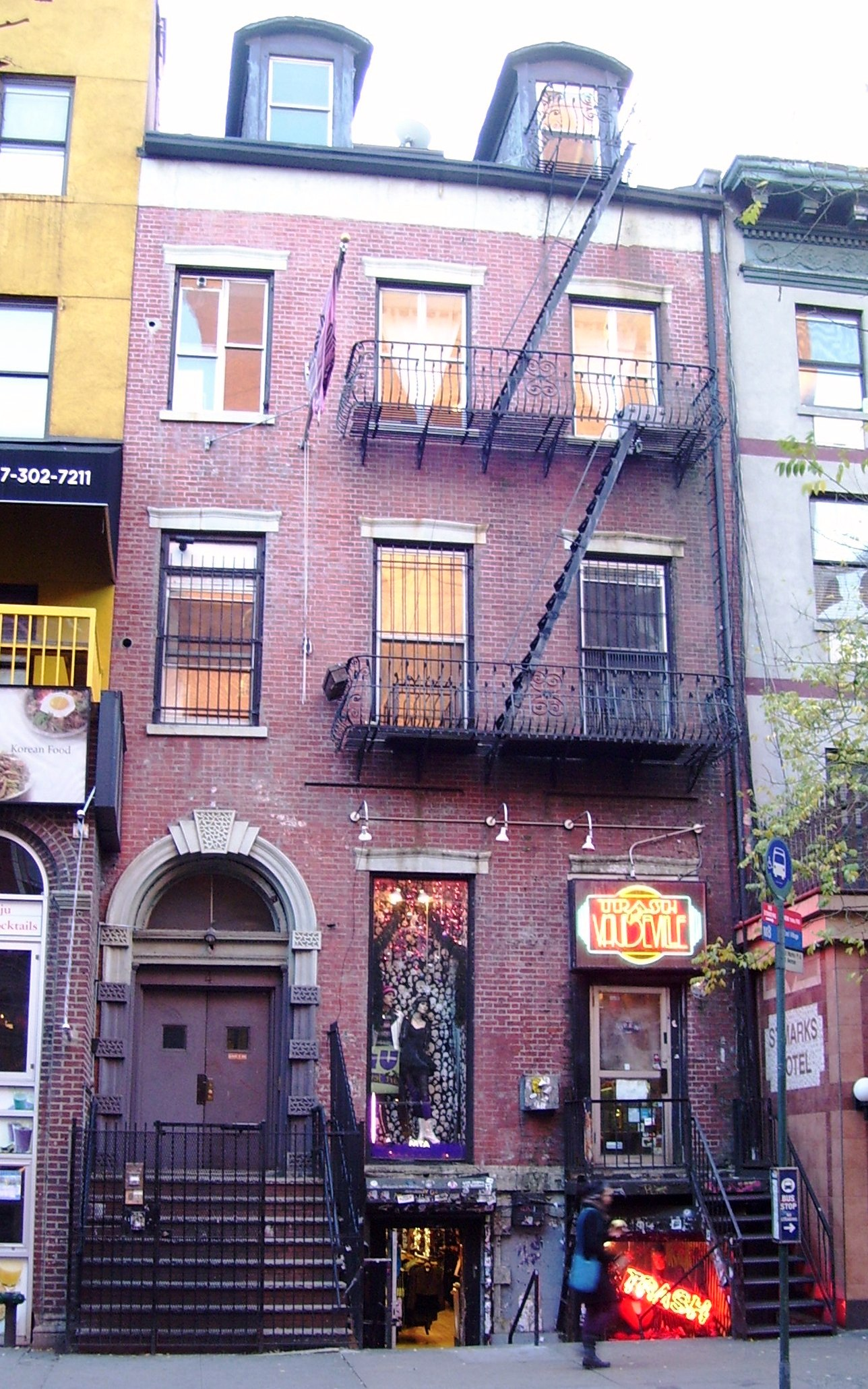
Trash and Vaudeville's old location, on the lower levels of the historic Hamilton-Holly House

Trash and Vaudeville is a store located at 96 East 7th Street between Avenue A and First Avenue in East Village in Manhattan, New York. The store is associated with the clothing styles of punk rock and various other counter culture movements, and has been a leading source of fashion inspiration since its inception by owner and founder Ray Goodman in 1975.

== History ==
Ray Goodman founded Trash & Vaudeville in 1975 inside the Hamilton-Holly House at 4 St. Mark's Place, New York, NY. The store occupied two floors of the house from 1975 to February 2016. The basement formerly housed a pinball parlor directly below the upstairs, which was accessed by an iron staircase. Although physically separated as two stores, they were regarded as one entity.

In July 2015, Trash and Vaudeville announced that they would be moving from St. Mark's Place to 96 East 7th Street between Avenue A and First Avenue. The controversial move was regarded by some as a mark of the gentrification of New York because Trash and Vaudeville was one of the last standing punk landmarks on St. Marks Place. This move kept the store within the East Village, a neighborhood known for its active nightlife. The original location closed at the end of February 2016, and the store reopened at 96 East 7th Street in March 2016.

=== Personnel ===
Ray Goodman, a graduate of the Fashion Institute of Technology, is the owner and head buyer. He was born in Jersey City and opened Trash & Vaudeville at the age of 18 after years of working in fashion and hanging on St. Marks Place.

Jimmy Webb was a salesperson and one of the assistant buyers from October 1999 until leaving the 7th Street location in 2020.

== Merchandise ==
The store was one of the first to stock the British Doc Martens boot, which became an international symbol of rebellion. They are the largest retail store stocked with Tripp NYC clothing, a brand created by Goodman and his wife, Daang Goodman. Other stocked items include bondage pants, creeper shoes, platform boots, leather motorcycle jackets, studded belts, leopard print jeans, winklepicker boots, spiky accessories, and band T-shirts.

Trash & Vaudeville made the first black skinny jeans in 1978, worn by musicians like the Ramones, and continues to sell the same namesake black skinny jean style today. The store continues to be a destination for punk, goth, glam, grunge, metal, streetwear, and skate fashion.

== Cultural significance ==
Trash and Vaudeville is famous for stars who shopped there, such as the Ramones, The Clash, Bruce Springsteen and Debbie Harry of Blondie, and many more musicians and actors during the golden age of punk rock in the 1970s and '80s. Many of today's top musicians and celebrities are still clothed by the store.

The store exterior appears on the cover of Meiko Nakahara's album Twin Best.
