= St. Michael's Church (Trenton, New Jersey) =

Historic church in New Jersey, United States

- St. Michael's Episcopal Church
- U.S. National Register of Historic Places
- New Jersey Register of Historic Places
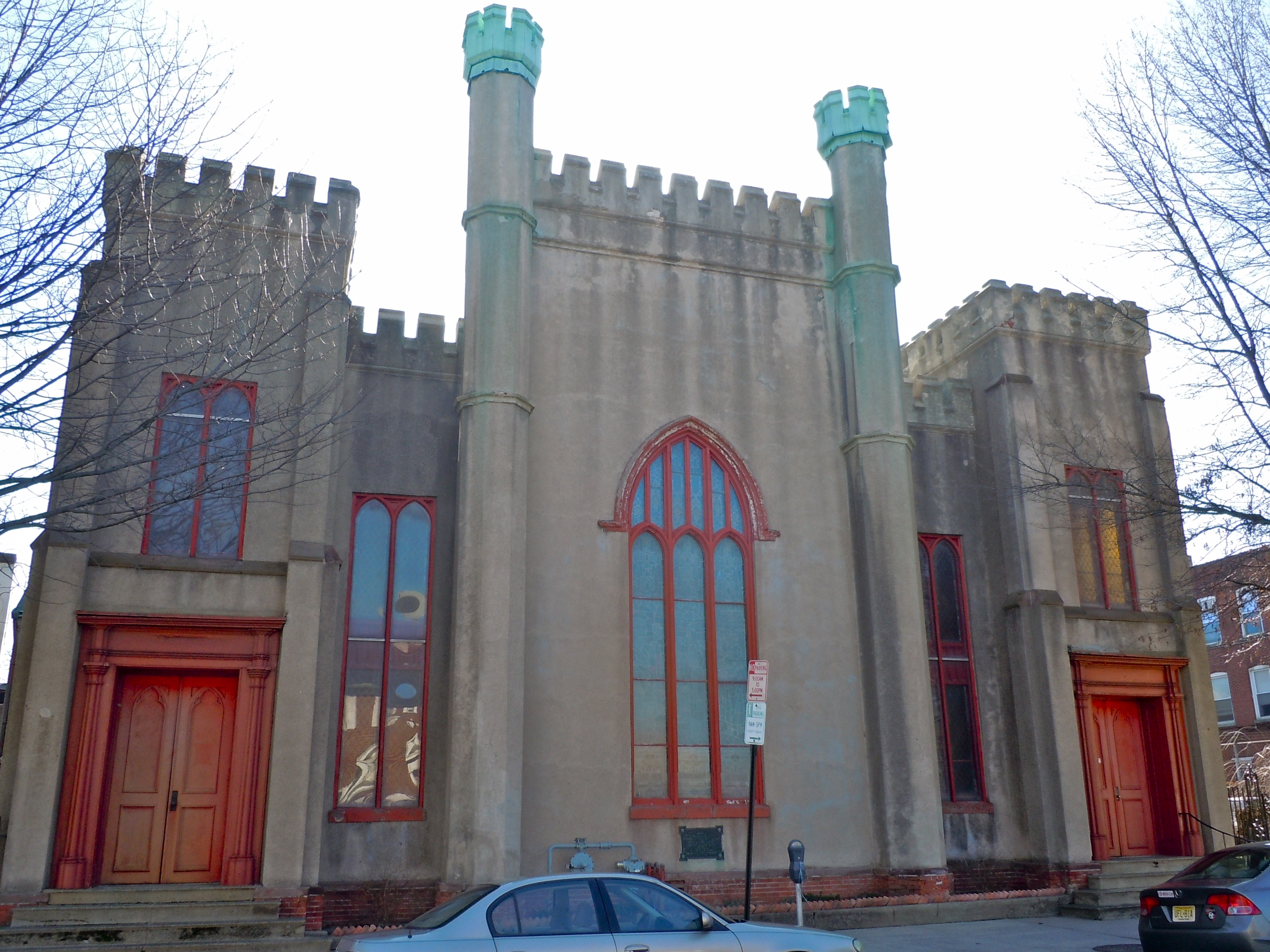

- Location within Mercer County, New Jersey Location within New Jersey Location within the United States
- Location: Trenton, New Jersey
- Coordinates: 40°13′20″N 74°45′55″W
- Built: 1748
- Architect: Augustine M. VanKirk
- Architectural style: Gothic Revival
- NRHP reference No.: 82003280
- NJRHP No.: 1792

Significant dates
- Added to NRHP: April 29, 1982
- Designated NJRHP: July 17, 1981

Established in 1703, St. Michael's Church in downtown Trenton, Mercer County, New Jersey, United States, is a founding parish of the Episcopal Diocese of New Jersey. Its present building located at 140 North Warren Street was built in 1747–1748, and was renovated in 1810 and 1847–1848. It was listed on the National Register of Historic Places on April 29, 1982, as St. Michael's Episcopal Church.

Its congregation, now a mission of the Episcopal Diocese of New Jersey, has involved itself in the history and culture of the city of Trenton from its founding in 1703 to the present. The church reported 59 members in 2016 and 22 members in 2025. Plate and pledge income reported for the congregation in 2025 was $71,015 with average Sunday attendance (ASA) of 14 persons.

== History ==
=== 18th century ===
St. Michael's was organized as a parish in 1703 in Hopewell Township. A Church of England building was erected on "Breese Farm" in 1704. In 1708 the parish was gifted with articles from Anne, Queen of Great Britain. These articles now reside in the New Jersey State Museum.

The main sanctuary of St. Michael's Church was built 1747–1748 at its present location on North Warren Street in Trenton. The building was extensively renovated in 1810. The distinctive turrets facing Warren Street remain from the 1810 renovation, but the bell tower is no longer standing.

In 1776, due to an even split of the congregation between Revolutionary and Loyalist sympathies, the building was closed and the congregation disbanded during the American Revolutionary War. During this time, the building was used as a hospital and the churchyard was a burial ground for Hessian soldiers fighting to retain British control of the American Colonies.

The Reverend William Frazer, who had been a Tory during the American Revolution, was permitted to resume his duties as rector at St. Michael's after the war. Frazer also ran a school, where his students in the early 1790s included the two oldest sons of Alexander Hamilton, Philip and Alexander Jr.

=== 19th century ===
In 1801, St. Michael's was host to the seventh General Convention of the Episcopal Church and the site where the delegates ratified a revised version of the Anglican Church's 39 Articles of Religion. This adaptation was thus accepted by the Protestant Episcopal Church USA, part of the Anglican Communion, yet not subject to oaths of loyalty to the British crown.

=== 20th century to date ===
Early in the 20th century, a delegation of parishioners from St. Michael's Church were involved in the founding of Trinity Episcopal Cathedral, the current seat of the Bishop of the Diocese of New Jersey.

Notable in more recent history is the voluntary racial integration of St. Michael's in 1955 through merger with the African congregation of St. Monica's Parish, occasioned by the Episcopal Church Women of their respective congregations. Through the end of the millennium at least St. Michael's parish has remained integrated with respect to race, national origin and language; today, St. Michael's Parish remains a diverse community.

In 1973 St. Michael's became a mission of the Episcopal Diocese of New Jersey. In 2006 St. Michael's Church was awarded a $50,000 grant for an architectural feasibility study due to the history of the building and grounds. In 2015 St. Michael's Church called a Lutheran pastor, the Rev'd Mark David Johnson, to serve as vicar.

During 2005 and 2006 Patriot's Week re-enactments of the Battle of Trenton, Continental Army reenactors passed by the Warren Street entrance to the sanctuary, sparing the delicate plaster walls the reenactment of a legendary cannon blast.

== Sanctuaries and churchyards ==
- The Hopewell Sanctuary: In 1704 the Church of England building was erected on "Breese Farm" (later the site of the New Jersey State Hospital in an area which became Ewing Township, NJ, in 1834).
- The North Warren Sanctuary (1748- : The principal sanctuary of St. Michael's was renovated to resemble Lambeth Palace with two turrets and a bell tower. The bell tower of St. Michael's is no longer standing, but the turrets and towers remain. Inside the main sanctuary are two Tiffany stained-glass windows.
- The churchyards and their notables: The churchyards of St. Michael's contain the graves of persons notable for their contributions to the history of the United States:
  - The Hopewell Churchyard: Mary Trent, wife of William Trent, founder of Trenton was buried in the Hopewell Graveyard.
  - The North Warren (Trenton) Churchyard: In the churchyard of St. Michael's on North Warren Street, a large, granite slab with prominent Masonic insignia marks the grave of David Brearley, a New Jersey delegate to the 1787 Philadelphia Constitutional Convention, signer of the U.S. Constitution and first New Jersey Supreme Court Chief Justice. The niece of Napoleon Bonaparte (daughter of Joseph Bonaparte, exiled to nearby Bordentown, New Jersey) also rests in the churchyard.

== Resources ==
- The primary source for much of St. Michael's history is the work of Hamilton Schuyler. A History of St. Michael's Church Trenton: In the Diocese of New Jersey from the year of our Lord 1703 to 1926: Told from the Minutes of the Vestry and other original sources, together with Biographical Sketches of Bishops, Rectors, and Men prominent in the Vestry and the Parish. Also Transcriptions from the Parish Register of Baptisms, Marriages and Burials; from the earliest entries down to 1855. Fully illustrated. Authorized for publication by the Vestry. Princeton University Press, Princeton. 1926. Of a printing of 500 copies, the church is fortunate as of 2007 to have at least two copies.
- Other sources which reference St. Michael's Church, Trenton include
  - William White's A sermon delivered before the general convention of the Protestant Episcopal church in the United States of America: In St. Michael's Church, Trenton, ... the Right Reverend Bishop Moore of New-York.
- Samuel Starr's 1850 A word of self-defence: Read by the rector, at a full meeting of the wardens and vestrymen of St. Michael's Church, Trenton, New Jersey, and published with their unanimous approval, September 1850
  - Trenton (Images of America (Arcadia Publishing)) by Cathleen Crown and Carol Rogers (Paperback – April 1, 2000)
  - History of St. Michael's, 1700–1925 (Unknown Binding)
