= Hamilton-Holly House =

House in Manhattan, New York

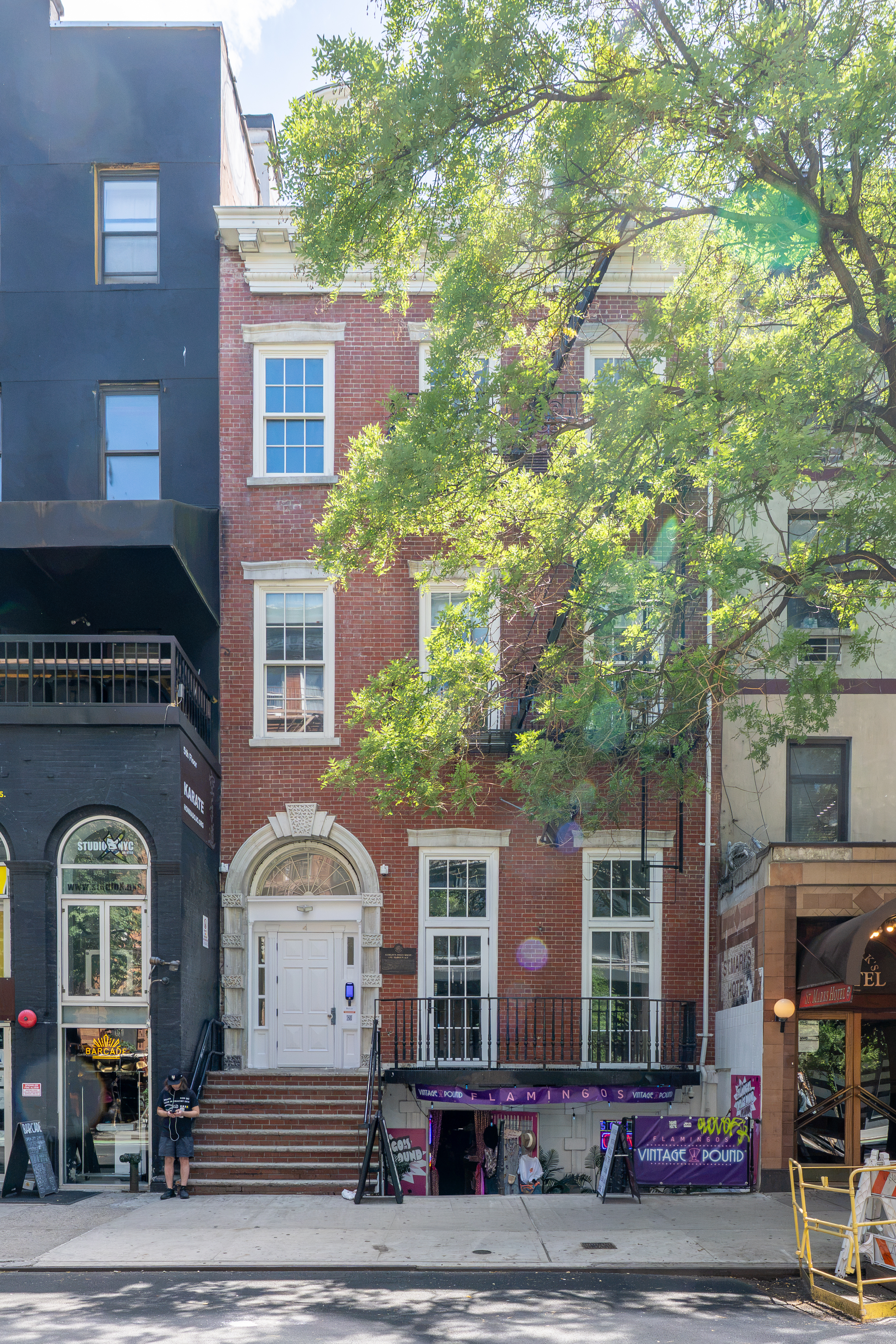
- Hamilton-Holly House (2026)

General information
- Architectural style: Federal
- Location: 4 St. Mark's Place; New York, New York 10003
- Coordinates: 40.7291°N 73.9897°W
- Completed: 1831

The Hamilton-Holly House is a Federal style townhouse at 4 St. Mark's Place in the East Village neighborhood of Manhattan in New York City. Constructed in 1831, it was the home of Eliza Hamilton, the widow of Alexander Hamilton, from 1833 to 1842. The Trash and Vaudeville fashion store was located there for over forty years ending in 2016.

== Building and initial development ==
19th-century appearance of St. Mark's Place townhouse

The property was developed by Thomas E. Davis, a British-born real estate developer, who developed the entire block of St. Mark's Place (the name of East 8th Street in this area) between Third and Second Avenues. Davis built Federal style townhouses on both sides of the street. There are two other surviving townhouses from this development, at 25 St. Mark's Place and the best preserved of the three, the Daniel LeRoy House at 20 St. Mark's Place.

The townhouse at 4 St. Mark's Place is 26 feet (8 m) wide and 3 1/2 stories in height plus a basement level. The house is built of brick in a Flemish bond pattern with white marble at the basement level up till the beginning of the first floor, it has a high front stoop to the main entrance on the left which is characterized by the Baroque style Gibbs surround entrance with triple keystone and vermiculated blocks and long parlor-floor windows, molded pediment lintels and a peaked roof with two dormer windows. There was originally a semi-circular wrought iron balcony at the elevated first floor level. Around 1865–66, a nearly 53-foot two-story rear addition was built in the large rear yard, and a fire escape was installed on the front facade by the 1890s.

== Historical significance ==
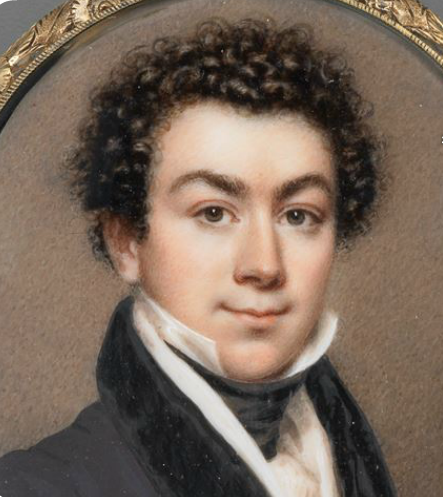
Sidney Augustus Holly, miniature portrait (c. 1830)

For nine years, the townhouse at 4 St. Mark's Place was the home of Elizabeth Schuyler Hamilton (Eliza), widow of Alexander Hamilton, who was the first Secretary of the Treasury and one of the Founding Fathers of the United States.

In November 1833, Eliza's son Col. Alexander Hamilton Jr. purchased the townhouse from Davis for $15,500. At the same time, Davis purchased The Grange (now the Hamilton Grange National Memorial) from Eliza, who was then 76 years old, for $25,000. The sale of the upper Manhattan home on 35 acres funded the Hamilton family's purchase of the townhouse. From 1833 to 1842, Eliza Hamilton lived there with two of her grown children and their spouses: her son Alexander and his wife Eliza Knox Hamilton, and her youngest daughter Eliza Hamilton Holly and her husband Sidney Augustus Holly.

The building, now known as the Hamilton-Holly House, was designated as a landmark in October 2004 by the New York City Landmarks Preservation Commission.

== Later uses ==
In the 1870s and 1880s, the building was used as a rental meeting hall, and the upper two stories became apartments. Later, the street level and basement became a rental property occupied by a succession of commercial tenants.

An auditorium in the basement level of the building became, in the 1950s and 1960s, the home of Julie Bovasso's Tempo Playhouse, which staged the American premieres of works by Jean Genet and Eugène Ionesco. It was later used by the New Bowery Theater, which debuted a number of early underground films.

For over forty years, from 1975 to February 2016, the first floor and basement were occupied by Trash and Vaudeville, a punk fashion store.

The property was listed for sale in 2015, at a price of roughly $12 million. After the building's retail space and four apartments were vacated, it was purchased by an investment group in April 2016 for $10 million. Portions of a renovation plan were approved by the Landmarks Preservation Commission in November 2016, including approval for restoration of the façade, reconstruction of the grand curved balcony at the first floor, a new entryway, and rebuilding the interior space to provide additional residential units.
