= Jimmy Webb (stylist) =

American punk fashion stylist (1957–2020)

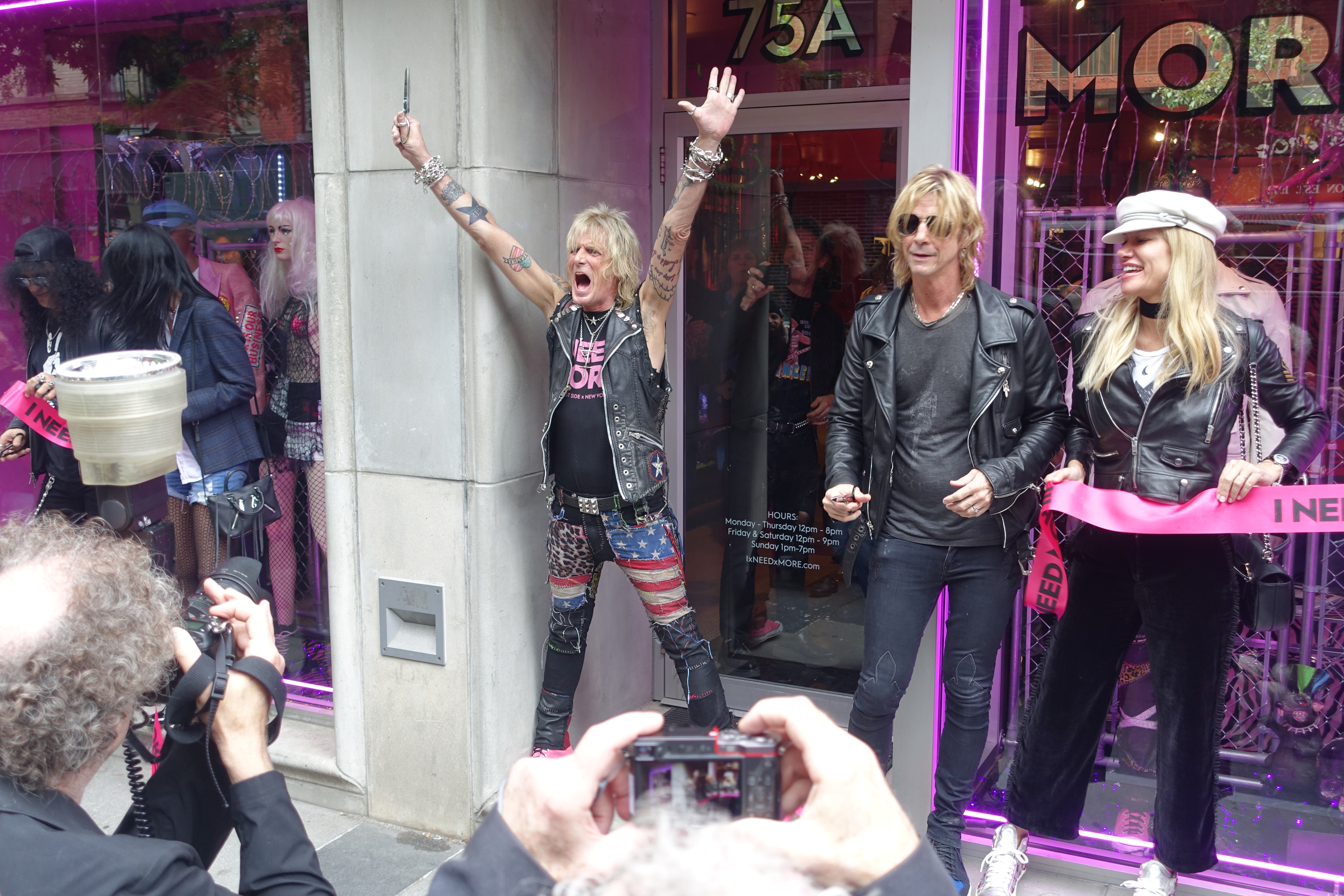
Webb (pictured center) cutting the ribbon to celebrate the opening of his rock boutique I NEED MORE alongside Slash and Duff McKagan from Gun's N Roses

James Kenneth Webb (August 28, 1957 – April 14, 2020) was a punk fashion stylist and the long-time manager of New York City's Trash and Vaudeville. Webb worked at Trash and Vaudeville from 1999 until the store moved off of St. Marks Place in 2016. As a stylist, Webb helped to dress artists and musicians such as the Ramones, Beyoncé, Lady Gaga, Joan Jett, Sebastian Bach and many others. On October 13, 2017, Webb opened his own rock boutique in New York City called "I Need More", named after a song by Iggy Pop, at 75A Orchard Street. The grand opening was attended by Slash and Duff from Guns N' Roses.

== Early life ==
Born James Kenneth Webb in Troy, New York, Webb grew up in nearby Wynantskill, New York. Webb's father, William, ran a two pump gas station which was attached to their family home. Webb and his two younger brothers were all encouraged to learn how to dance by their mother, Nancy. Webb graduated from high school three years early, at the age of 16 and briefly attended a community college in Connecticut before leaving school to hitchhike to Florida and New York.

Webb began living in New York in 1975 and developed a heroin addiction. He initially settled on Fourth Street and Avenue D and spent some nights sleeping in Tompkins Square Park or the St. Marks Baths.

== Death ==
Webb was diagnosed with cancer in 2018 and died at his apartment in Manhattan on April 14, 2020. He was survived by his brother Ronald. Musician, Iggy Pop wrote an Instagram tribute post for Webb in which he referred to him as "Proust in streetwear, showing his ass crack." On hearing of Webb's death, Debbie Harry remarked to the New York Post and Rolling Stone, “We are all going to miss our wonderful friend Jimmy Webb. There goes a lovely unique NYC character. I feel lucky to have known him."
