= Angelica Hamilton =

Daughter of Alexander Hamilton

- Born: September 25, 1784
- Died: February 6, 1857 (aged 72)
- Resting place: Sleepy Hollow Cemetery, Sleepy Hollow, New York
- Parent(s): Alexander Hamilton; Elizabeth Schuyler
- Relatives: See Hamilton family

Angelica Hamilton (September 25, 1784 – February 6, 1857) was the second child and eldest daughter of Elizabeth Schuyler and Alexander Hamilton, who was the first U.S. Secretary of the Treasury and one of the Founding Fathers of the United States.

== Early life ==
In a letter to the nine-year-old Angelica Hamilton, who was then staying with her grandparents in Albany, Alexander Hamilton wrote:

I was very glad to learn, my dear daughter, that you were going to begin the study of the French language. We hope you will in every respect behave in such a manner as will secure to you the good-will and regard of all those with whom you are. If you happen to displease any of them, be always ready to make a frank apology. But the best way is to act with so much politeness, good manners, and circumspection, as never to have occasion to make any apology. Your mother joins in best love to you. Adieu, my very dear daughter.

— Alexander Hamilton, Letter to Angelica Hamilton, Nov. 1793

Angelica was described as a sensitive, lively and musical girl in her youth. She was said to resemble, in beauty, her maternal aunt Angelica Schuyler Church, for whom she was named. During her father's time as Secretary of the Treasury, Martha Washington would take Angelica with her to dance lessons along with her own children.

In addition to French and dance lessons, Angelica played a piano that was bought for her by her aunt Angelica Church, which was sent from London to New York through a friend of her father. Alexander Hamilton, according to a grandson, had a "rich voice" and enjoyed singing popular songs of the day, and "Angelica often accompanied him upon the piano or harp, and appears to have been given all the advantages of a musical education."

== Mental illness ==
In November 1801, when Angelica was 17 years old, her oldest brother died of injuries resulting from a duel. The news of her brother Philip's death precipitated a mental breakdown that left Angelica in a state described as "eternal childhood", and often unable even to recognize family members. She was identified as mentally unstable and insane.

Angelica's nephew, psychiatrist Allan McLane Hamilton, described his aunt as an "invalid" and her condition as a type of "insanity". Dr. Hamilton wrote, "Upon receipt of the news of Philip's death in the duel, she suffered so great a shock that her mind became permanently impaired, and although taken care of by her devoted mother for a long time there was no amelioration in her condition."

Though the details of what occurred are not clear from a modern medical perspective, historian Ron Chernow similarly attributed the sudden and extreme deterioration of Angelica's mental health to her reaction to the death of Philip, with whom she had been very close. Other modern authors have described the mental health problem, which lasted for the rest of Angelica's life, without discussion of causation.

Despite her parents' best efforts to reach her, Angelica's condition only seemed to worsen. Her father had written his friend Charles Cotesworth Pinckney and asked him to send Angelica watermelons and three parakeets, as she was "very fond of birds". After visiting the Hamilton home, James Kent tactfully described Angelica as having "a very uncommon simplicity and modesty of deportment".

== Adulthood and later life ==
Years after Alexander Hamilton's death in July 1804, Angelica's aging mother could no longer care for her. Angelica was eventually placed in the care of a Dr. MacDonald of Flushing, Queens, where she remained for the rest of her life. Of this period, her nephew wrote:

During her later life she constantly referred to the dear brother so nearly her own age as if alive. Her music, that her father used to oversee and encourage, stayed by her all these years. To the end she played the same old-fashioned songs and minuets upon the venerable piano that had been bought for her, many years before.

In 1848, Angelica's sister, Eliza Hamilton Holly, moved their 91-year-old mother, Elizabeth, from New York to Washington, D.C., where she died in 1854 at age 97. Elizabeth Hamilton requested in her will that her other children be "kind, affectionate, and attentive" to her "unfortunate daughter Angelica." Eliza Holly, in a letter to an aunt anticipating Angelica's death, remarked that their mother had not wished to outlive Angelica, and wrote, "Poor sister, what a happy release will be hers! Lost to herself half a century."

Three years after her mother's death, in February 1857, Angelica died in New York at age 72. She was buried in Westchester County, New York at Sleepy Hollow Cemetery.

== In popular culture ==
In the 2015 musical Hamilton, Hamilton's daughter Angelica is mentioned, although not by name, in the songs "Take a Break" and "We Know". The events of both songs take place prior to the birth of Hamilton's second daughter, Eliza, in 1799.
