= Alexander Hamilton Jr. =

Son of Alexander Hamilton, American soldier and attorney (1786-1875)

Member of the New York State Assembly from New York
- In office July 1, 1818 – June 30, 1819

Personal details
- Born: May 16, 1786 New York City, Province of New York
- Died: August 2, 1875 (aged 89) New York City, New York, U.S.
- Party: Democratic-Republican
- Other political affiliations: Bucktail
- Spouse: Eliza P. Knox (m. 1817; died 1871)
- Parents: Alexander Hamilton; Elizabeth Schuyler
- Relatives: See Hamilton family
- Education: Columbia College
- Occupation: Lawyer; real estate developer

Colonel Alexander Hamilton Jr. (May 16, 1786 – August 2, 1875) was the third child and the second son of Elizabeth Schuyler and Alexander Hamilton, one of the Founding Fathers of the United States.

== Education ==
By the age of eight, Hamilton began attending a boarding school in Trenton, New Jersey, where he joined his older brother Philip studying with William Frazer, an Episcopal clergyman and rector of St. Michael's Church.

In 1795 when the family moved back to New York the boys enrolled in Bishop Moore’s school for boys on Staten Island, returning to New York Friday evenings to spend Sundays with the family.

Hamilton was then likely transferred to James Tod's school in New Utrecht with his younger brother James, during 1800.

He later attended Columbia College in New York. Hamilton graduated on the 1st of August, 1804, at age eighteen just weeks after his father's death. According to the St. Andrew's Society of New York, of which Hamilton was a member, Hamilton "did not graduate on account of an accident", but shortly afterward began the study of law.

== Career ==
After college, Hamilton was asked to be an apprentice attorney in Stephen Higginson's Boston law firm, and was later admitted to practice law.

He sailed to Spain in 1811 or 1812, during a period of political conflict preceding the War of 1812, and joined the Duke of Wellington's forces, then fighting against Napoleon's army in Portugal. After acquiring some military and strategic training with the British Army, Hamilton returned to America to serve in the War of 1812, receiving a commission as Captain of the 41st Regiment of Infantry in the United States Army in August 1813. The 41st Regiment did not appear to have seen active service in the war, and Hamilton went on to act as aide-de-camp to his father's friend General Morgan Lewis in 1814, serving until June 15, 1815.

Hamilton resumed the practice of law, and took office in July 1818 as a member of the 42nd New York State Legislature for a one-year term, as one of eleven representatives to the New York State Assembly from New York City.

In May 1822, President James Monroe appointed Hamilton as a United States Attorney for East Florida. In 1823, he was appointed to be one of three Land Commissioners for East Florida, and while there, he received the honorary civilian rank of colonel. He ran unsuccessfully against Richard K. Call to be the Florida Territory's delegate in the United States House of Representatives.

Hamilton subsequently returned to New York, where he became successful in real estate transactions, and for many years was one of the leading names in Wall Street.

In the mid-1830s, as a lawyer in the New York Court of Chancery, Hamilton represented Eliza Jumel against her husband Aaron Burr during two years of divorce proceedings, which were finalized in 1836 on the day of Burr's death. She and Burr had separated after only four months of marriage.

Hamilton had a "large and varied correspondence" with other political contemporaries including his close friend Henry Clay, John C. Calhoun, Salmon P. Chase, and Presidents James Monroe and Zachary Taylor.

== Personal life ==
Hamilton courted Eliza Putnam Knox, the daughter of Thomas Knox, a leading New York City merchant, and Mary Hester Knox, née Kortright, the sister of Elizabeth Monroe. Eliza's birth date is unknown, but Trinity Church, New York, has a record of her baptism which took place there on August 3, 1794. According to John Pintard, Eliza and Hamilton eloped and ran away from the Knoxes initially, before matters were resolved.

In 1833, Hamilton used funds from his mother's sale of The Grange to purchase a townhouse for her and his family in New York City, at 4 St. Mark's Place (now known as the Hamilton-Holly House). Between 1833 and 1842, he and his wife lived there with his mother, his sister Eliza Hamilton Holly, and her husband Sidney Augustus Holly.

During a trip through the West with his wife in 1835, Hamilton met Abraham Lincoln, then an Illinois state legislator, in a grocery store where Lincoln was "lying upon the counter in midday telling stories." During the last ten years of his life, Hamilton resided in New Brunswick, New Jersey, and in New York City, where he moved after the death of his wife in 1871. Hamilton died, having had no children, on August 2, 1875, at his home, 83 Clinton Place, in Greenwich Village. Hamilton was said to have been 5 ft 6.5 in (169 cm) tall.
