= Eliza Hamilton Holly =

Daughter of Alexander Hamilton (1799 – 1859)

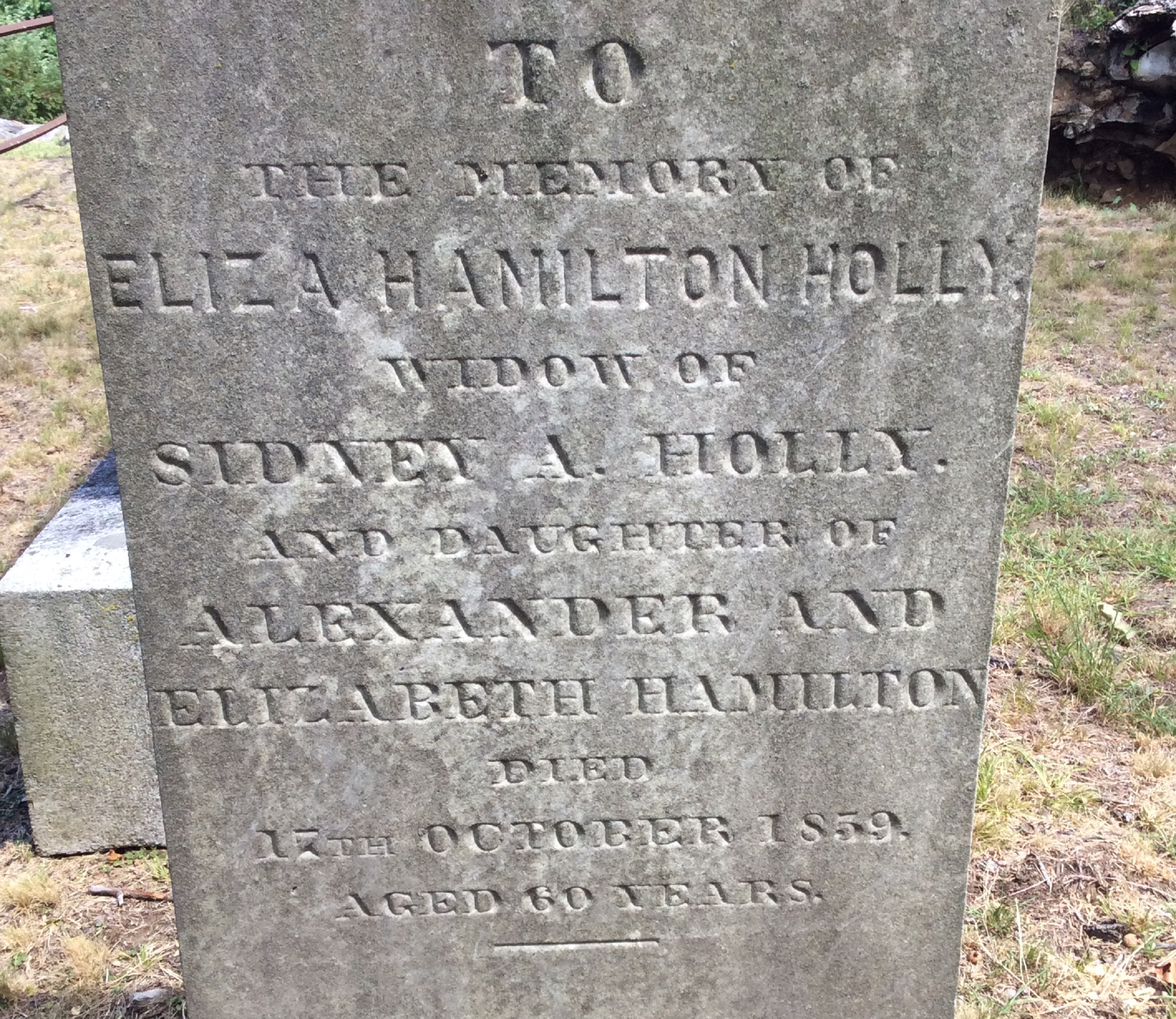
- Born: Eliza Hamilton; November 20, 1799; New York City, New York
- Died: October 17, 1859 (aged 59); Washington, D.C.
- Resting place: Sleepy Hollow Cemetery, Sleepy Hollow, New York
- Spouse: Sidney Augustus Holly (m. 1825; died 1842)
- Parent(s): Alexander Hamilton; Elizabeth Schuyler Hamilton
- Relatives: See Hamilton family

Eliza Hamilton Holly (November 20, 1799 – October 17, 1859) was the seventh child and second daughter of Alexander Hamilton, one of the Founding Fathers of the United States, and his wife, Elizabeth Schuyler Hamilton.

== Early life ==
Eliza was born in New York City, New York on November 20, 1799, to Alexander Hamilton and Elizabeth Schuyler Hamilton. Unlike her mother (who was called Eliza as a nickname), her name was Eliza, not Elizabeth; the first name Eliza was given on her baptismal and marriage records.

She was a sick infant, about whom Hamilton troubled himself as he began to find solace in his family in the late 1790s. While home with the children in his wife's absence, Hamilton wrote of his three-year-old daughter, "Eliza pouts and plays, and displays more and more her ample stock of Caprice." She was affectionately nicknamed "Little Betsey" by her father.

Eliza was only four years old when her father engaged in the duel with Aaron Burr that ended his life. She was one of more than twenty friends and family members of Hamilton to see him in his last hours, and was one of the last sights Hamilton saw, as his wife lined all seven of their living children at the foot of the bed so Hamilton could see them before he died. She and her mother were not a part of Hamilton's funeral processions.

== Education ==
Eliza attended school at age four, around the same time as her older brother William. Her mother wrote to her grandfather, General Philip Schuyler, in 1804; “Eliza and William go every morning to school, very contented and have their dinner sent to them.”

== Marriage and family ==
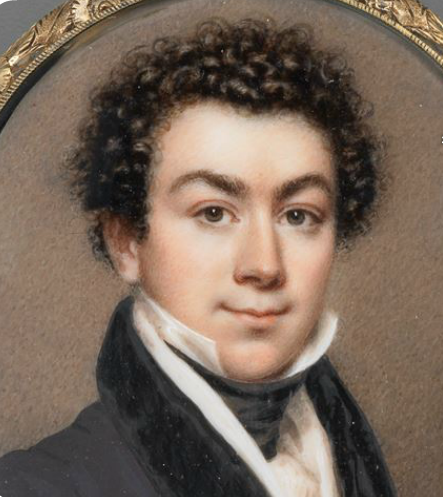
Sidney Augustus Holly, miniature portrait (c. 1830)

Eliza married Sidney Augustus Holly on July 19, 1825, and they remained married until his death in 1842. Holly, a merchant in New York City, was one of eight children of David Holly (1768–1843), a large land owner in Stamford, Connecticut. Holly's family, descended from one of Stamford's earliest settlers in 1642, was prominent in business and local government.

From 1825 to 1833, Eliza and her husband lived at The Grange (now the Hamilton Grange National Memorial) with her mother, Elizabeth Schuyler Hamilton. Eliza and her mother remained very close for all her life. In a December 1832 letter to Eliza, Elizabeth compared her to her father: "You don't know how important you are to me. You step in the steps of your father's kindness, and the more you are with me, the more I see that you are like him."

After the sale of The Grange in 1833, Eliza and Sidney Holly continued to live with Elizabeth until 1842, together with Eliza's brother Alexander Hamilton Jr. and his wife Eliza P. Knox Hamilton. The family shared an East Village, Manhattan townhouse at 4 St. Mark's Place (now known as the Hamilton-Holly House), which Alexander Jr. had purchased for their mother using proceeds from the sale of The Grange.

Eliza and her husband traveled in 1837 to the Wisconsin Territory for several months, accompanying her 80-year-old mother on a visit to Eliza's older brother William S. Hamilton. Eliza became ill during the trip, possibly with yellow fever. Her mother wrote:

My Eliz [sic] has been a good deal indisposed. I hope a few days she will be enabled to go to the Wisconsin.... My Idea as to the Accommodation in case of disease for my daughter was to have hired a portion of one of the Building as I had paid liberally so that it would not have been a disadvantage to the society. A part of the former house was let as a store and their must have been persons going to and fro during the yellow fever.

== Later life ==
Eliza was widowed on June 26, 1842. That year, she moved with her mother to 63 Prince Street in Lower Manhattan, which had previously been the home of President James Monroe and Samuel L. Gouverneur.

In 1848, she and her mother moved to Washington, D.C. They lived near the White House in a house on H Street, where they entertained many guests. On New Year's Day of 1853 alone, their visitors included General Winfield Scott, New York Senator William H. Seward, and President Millard Fillmore. A month after their first meeting with President Fillmore in their house, Eliza and her mother dined at the White House with Fillmore and his wife.

Eliza continued to care for her mother until 1854, when she died at age 97. After her mother's death, it is believed that Eliza influenced or expedited the creation of the biography of her father by her brother John Church Hamilton, as she chastised him for his overdue writing based upon their mother's imperative that "Justice shall be done to the memory of my Hamilton."

Eliza Hamilton Holly died in Washington, D.C., on October 17, 1859, due to an unknown illness. According to the memoirs of her friend, Marian Gouverneur, she had been sick for at least a month before her death. She and her husband left no descendants. She was buried in Westchester County, New York at Sleepy Hollow Cemetery, where her sister Angelica Hamilton had been buried two years earlier; in 1878, their brother James Alexander Hamilton was also buried there.
