= Elizabeth Schuyler Hamilton =

Wife of Alexander Hamilton (1757–1854)

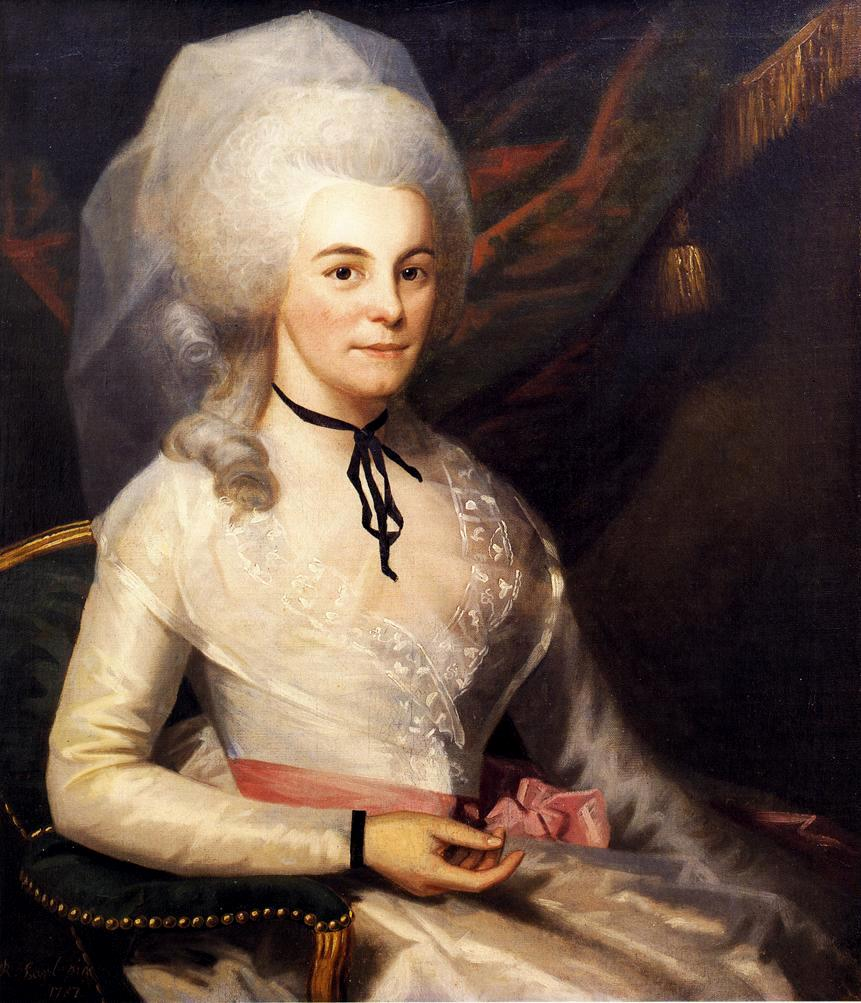
- 1787 portrait
- Born: Elizabeth Schuyler; August 9, 1757; Albany, Province of New York, British America
- Died: November 9, 1854 (aged 97); Washington, D.C., U.S.
- Resting place: Trinity Church Cemetery, New York City, U.S.
- Spouse: Alexander Hamilton (m. 1780; died 1804)
- Children: Philip; Angelica; Alexander Jr.; James; John; William; Eliza; Philip II
- Parents: Philip Schuyler (father); Catherine Van Rensselaer (mother)
- Family: Schuyler, Hamilton

Elizabeth Hamilton (née Schuyler /ˈskaɪlər/; August 9, 1757 – November 9, 1854) was an American socialite and philanthropist. She was the wife of American Founding Father Alexander Hamilton and was a passionate champion and defender of Hamilton's work and efforts in the American Revolution and the founding of the United States.

She was the co-founder and deputy director of Graham Windham, the first private orphanage in New York City. She is recognized as an early American philanthropist for her work with the Orphan Asylum Society.

== Early life ==
Schuyler was born in Albany, New York, the second daughter of Philip Schuyler, who would later be an American Revolutionary War general, and his wife, Catherine Van Rensselaer. The Van Rensselaers of the Manor of Rensselaerswyck were one of the wealthiest and most politically influential families in what was then the Province of New York. She had 14 siblings, only seven of whom lived to adulthood, including Angelica Schuyler Church and Peggy Schuyler.

Her family was among the wealthy Dutch landowners who settled around present-day Albany, New York, in the mid-17th century. Both her mother and father came from wealthy and well-regarded families. Like many landowners of the time, her father was a slave owner, so Schuyler grew up around slavery. While she was growing up, there was the unrest of the French and Indian War, which her father served in and which was fought in part near her childhood home.

Like most Dutch families of the area, her family belonged to the Reformed Dutch Church of Albany, which still stands. Her upbringing instilled in her a strong and unwavering faith she would retain throughout her life.

When she was a girl, Schuyler accompanied her father to a meeting of the Six Nations, where she met Benjamin Franklin, who stayed briefly with the Schuyler family during his travels. She was said to have been something of a tomboy when she was young; throughout her life, she displayed both strong will and impulsiveness, both of which were noted by her acquaintances, James McHenry, one of George Washington's aides who worked alongside her future husband, and the son of Joanna Bethune, one of the women she worked alongside to found an orphanage later in her life. In 1779, Tench Tilghman met Schuyler and wrote the following:

I was prepossessed in favor of the young Lady the moment I saw her. A Brunette with the most good natured lively dark eyes that I ever saw, which threw a beam of good temper and benevolence over her whole Countenance. Mr. Livingston informed me that I was not mistaken in my Conjecture that she was the finest tempered Girl in the World.

== Marriage to Alexander Hamilton ==
=== Meeting Hamilton ===
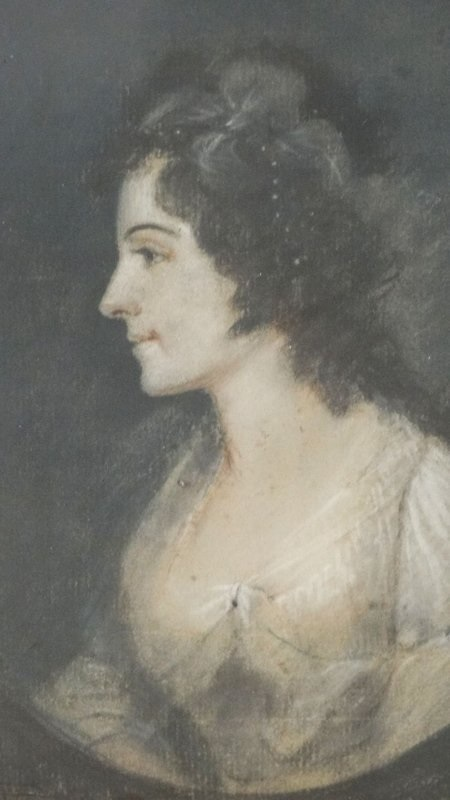
Elizabeth Hamilton depicted in a c. 1795 portrait by James Sharples

In early 1780, Schuyler went to stay with her aunt, Gertrude Schuyler Cochran, in Morristown, New Jersey, where she met Alexander Hamilton, one of George Washington's aides-de-camp, who was stationed with Washington and his men in Morristown for the winter of 1780. Schuyler and Hamilton had met once before, but only briefly, when Hamilton dined with the Schuylers on his way back from a negotiation on Washington's behalf. Also while in Morristown, Schuyler met and became friends with Martha Washington, a friendship they maintained for the rest of their husbands' respective political careers. Schuyler later said of Martha Washington, "She was always my ideal of a true woman."

=== Courtship and marriage ===
The relationship between Schuyler and Hamilton quickly grew; even after he left Morristown a month later on a short mission to negotiate a prisoners exchange. While on the prisoner exchange, Hamilton wrote to Schuyler, continuing their relationship through letters.

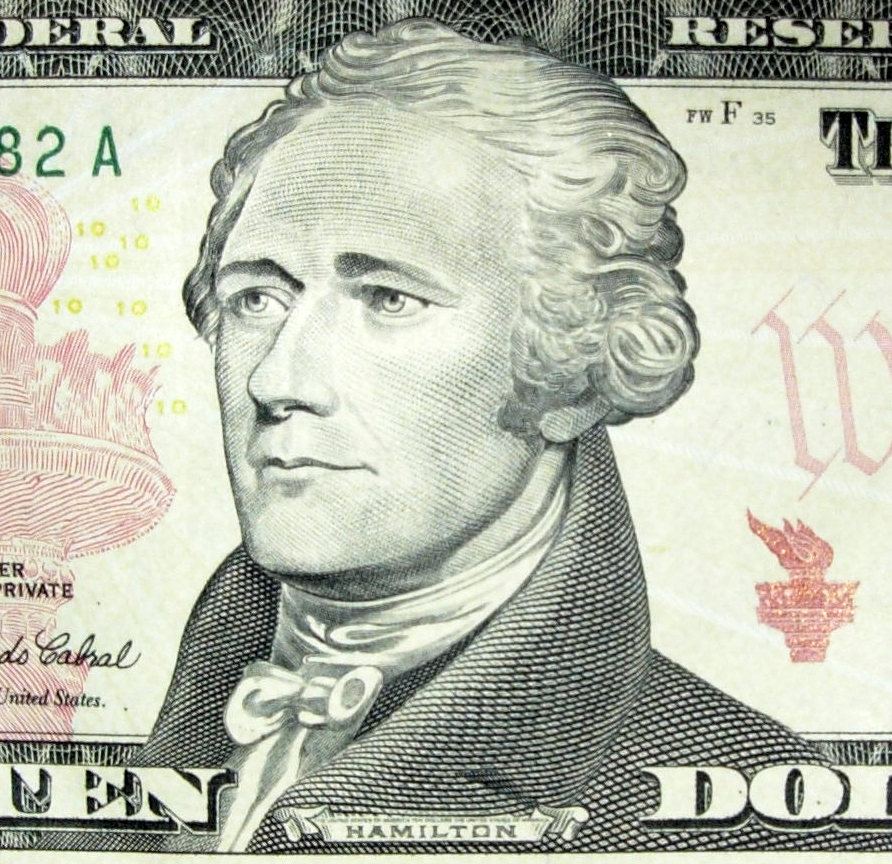
Alexander Hamilton featured on the Ten Dollar Bill

After completing the prisoner exchange negotiations, Hamilton returned to Morristown, where Schuyler's father had arrived in his capacity as representative of the Continental Congress. In correspondence between Hamilton and Schuyler, there had been talk of a "secret wedding". In early April 1780, they were officially engaged with her father's blessing, which was something of an anomaly for the family with Schuyler's two sisters, Angelica and Catherine, both eloping. Later on, her two other sisters eloped as well, leaving Elizabeth the exception.

Hamilton followed the Continental Army when they decamped from Morristown in June 1780. After six more months of separation punctuated by their correspondence, on December 14, 1780, Alexander Hamilton and Elizabeth Schuyler were married at the Schuyler Mansion.

After a short honeymoon at the Pastures, her childhood home in Albany, New York, Alexander Hamilton returned to the Continental Army and the Revolutionary War in early January 1781. Schuyler soon joined him in New Windsor, New York, where Washington's Continental Army was now stationed, and she rekindled her friendship with Martha Washington as they entertained their husbands' fellow officers. Soon, however, Washington and Alexander Hamilton had a falling out, and the newlywed couple moved, first back to Philip Schuyler's house in Albany, then to a new home across the river from the New Windsor headquarters. There, Schuyler busied herself in creating a home for them and in aiding Hamilton with his political writings, including parts of his 31-page letter to Robert Morris, in which Alexander communicated his extensive understanding of government finance, which he later employed as the nation's first Secretary of the Treasury during Washington's presidency. Parts of the letter to Morris are in Schuyler's handwriting.

Soon Schuyler moved again, this time back to her parents' house in Albany. This may have coincided with the discovery that she was pregnant with their first child, who was born the following January and named Philip, in honor of her father. While apart, Alexander wrote her numerous letters assuring her not to worry for his safety; in addition, he wrote her concerning confidential military secrets, including the lead-up to the Battle of Yorktown that autumn. Meanwhile, the Revolutionary War began raging close to her home, when a group of British soldiers stumbled upon her residence at the Pastures, seeking supplies. According to some accounts, the family was spared from any losses thanks to her sister Peggy, who told the soldiers that her father had gone to town to get help, which caused them to flee from the area.

After the siege of Yorktown, a decisive Franco-American victory which led the British to recognize their defeat in the war, Hamilton rejoined Schuyler in Albany, where they remained for almost another two years prior to relocating to New York City in late 1783. On September 25, 1784, Schuyler gave birth to her second child, Angelica, named after her older sister.

In 1787, Schuyler sat for a portrait, painted by Ralph Earl while Earl was being held in debtors' prison. Hamilton heard of Earl's predicament and asked his wife if she might be willing to sit for him, to allow him to make some money and eventually buy his way out of prison, which he subsequently did. At this time, she and Alexander had three young children; their third child, Alexander Jr., was born in May 1786, and she may have been pregnant then with their fourth child, James Alexander, who was born the following April.

The same year, in 1787, Schuyler and Hamilton took into their home Frances Antill, the two-year-old youngest child of Hamilton's friend Colonel Edward Antill, whose wife had recently died. In October that year, Angelica wrote to Hamilton, "All the graces you have been pleased to adorn me with fade before the generous and benevolent action of my sister in taking the orphan Antle [sic] under her protection." Two years later, Colonel Antill died in Canada, and Frances continued to live with the Hamiltons for another eight years, until an older sister was married and able to take Frances into her own home. Later, James Alexander Hamilton would write that Frances "was educated and treated in all respects as [the Hamiltons'] own daughter."

The Hamiltons had an active social life, often attending the theater and various balls and parties. "I had little of private life in those days," she would remember. At the first Inaugural Ball, Schuyler danced with George Washington; when Thomas Jefferson returned from Paris in 1790, she and Alexander hosted a dinner for him. After Alexander became Treasury Secretary in 1789, her social duties increased. "Mrs. Hamilton, Mrs. [Sarah] Jay and Mrs. [Lucy] Knox were the leaders of official society," an early historian wrote in 1897. She also managed the Hamilton household; James McHenry once noted to Hamilton that Schuyler had "as much merit as your treasurer as you have as treasurer of the United States."

Schuyler also continued to aid her husband throughout his political career, serving as an intermediary between him and his publisher when he was writing The Federalist Papers, copying out portions of his defense of the Bank of the United States, and attending to him so he could read Washington's Farewell Address out loud to her as he wrote it. Meanwhile, she continued to raise her children; a fifth child, John Church Hamilton, was born in August 1792. She maintained their household through multiple moves between New York City, Philadelphia, and Albany.

While in Philadelphia, around November 24, 1794, Schuyler suffered a miscarriage in the wake of her youngest child falling extremely ill and her worries over Alexander's absence during his armed suppression of the Whiskey Rebellion. Hamilton resigned from public office immediately afterwards in order to resume his law practice in New York and remain closer to his family.

=== Hamilton–Reynolds affair and aftermath ===
In 1797, an affair came to light that had taken place several years earlier between Hamilton and Maria Reynolds, a young woman who first approached Hamilton for monetary aid in the summer of 1791. Schuyler evidently did not believe the charges when they were first leveled against her husband: John Church, her brother-in-law, on July 13, 1797, wrote to Hamilton that "it makes not the least Impression on her, only that she considers the whole Knot of those opposed to you to be [Scoundrels]." After returning home to his wife on July 22 and assembling a first draft dated July 1797, on August 25, 1797, Hamilton published a pamphlet, later known as the Reynolds Pamphlet, admitting to his one-year adulterous affair in order to refute the charges that he had been involved in speculation and public misconduct with Maria's husband James Reynolds.

Schuyler was, at the time, pregnant with their sixth child. Despite her advanced pregnancy and her previous miscarriage of November 1794, her initial reaction to her husband's disclosure of his past affair was to leave Alexander in New York and join her parents in Albany, where their son William Stephen was born on August 4, 1797. She returned to her marital house in New York City in early September 1797, in part because the local medical doctor had been unable to cure their eldest son Philip, who had accompanied her to Albany and contracted typhus. Schuyler and Hamilton reconciled and remained married, and had two more children together. The first, Eliza, named for her mother, was born on November 20, 1799. Before their eighth child was born, however, they lost their oldest son, Philip, who died in a duel on November 24, 1801. After being shot on the dueling field, Philip was brought to Angelica and John Church's house, where he died after 14 hours with both of his parents by his side through the night. Their last child, born the next June in 1802, was named Philip in his honor.

During this time, Alexander commissioned John McComb Jr. to construct the Hamilton family home. In 1802, the same year that Philip was born, the house was built and named Hamilton Grange, after Alexander's father's home in Scotland. The Hamiltons continued to live together in a caring relationship in their new home that can be seen in letters between the two at the time. When Schuyler went away attending her mother's funeral in 1803, Alexander wrote to her from the Grange Estate, telling her:

I am anxious to hear of your arrival at Albany and shall be glad to be informed that your father and all of you are composed. I pray you to exert yourself and I repeat my exhortation that you will bear in mind it is your business to comfort and not to distress.

=== Burr–Hamilton Duel ===
Two years after Hamilon Grange was built, on July 11, 1804, Alexander was mortally wounded by his foe, then U.S. vice president Aaron Burr, in the Burr–Hamilton duel in Weehawken, New Jersey.

Prior to the duel, Hamilton, seemingly anticipating his possible death, wrote his wife two letters, telling her:

The consolations of Religion, my beloved, can alone support you; and these you have a right to enjoy. Fly to the bosom of your God and be comforted. With my last idea; I shall cherish the sweet hope of meeting you in a better world. Adieu best of wives and best of Women. Embrace all my darling Children for me.

Heaven can preserve me and I humbly hope will but in the contrary event, I charge you to remember that you are a Christian. God's Will be done. The will of a merciful God must be good. Once more Adieu My Darling darling Wife.

Alexander Hamilton died on July 12, 1804, with his wife, and all seven of his surviving children by his side.

== Later life ==
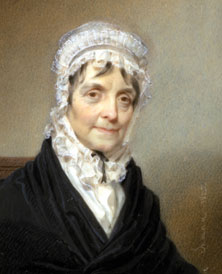
Elizabeth Hamilton, 1825 portrait by Henry Inman

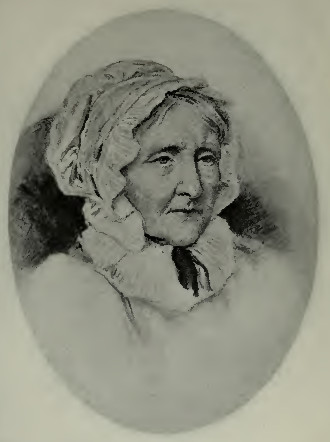
Elizabeth Hamilton at 94

In the year before the Burr–Hamilton duel, Schuyler's mother, Catherine, died suddenly. A few months later, Schuyler's father Philip also died. She also had experienced the death of two of her siblings who lived to adulthood, Peggy and John.

After her husband's death in 1804, Schuyler was left to pay his debts. The Grange, their house on a 35-acre estate in Upper Manhattan, was sold at public auction; however, she was later able to repurchase it from the executors, who decided that Schuyler could not be publicly dispossessed of her home, and purchased it themselves to sell back to her at half the price. In November 1833, at the age of 76, Schuyler resold The Grange for $25,000 ($834,052 in 2025), funding the purchase of a New York City townhouse, the Hamilton-Holly House, where she lived for nine years with two of her grown children, Alexander Hamilton Jr. and Eliza Hamilton Holly, and their spouses. Schuyler was also able to collect Hamilton's pension from his service in the Continental Army from Congress in 1836 for money and land. In 1848, she departed New York City for Washington, D.C., where she lived with her widowed daughter Eliza until 1854.

In 1798, Schuyler had accepted her friend Isabella Graham's invitation to join the descriptively named Society for the Relief of Poor Widows with Small Children that had been established the previous year. In 1806, two years after her husband's death, along with several other women including Joanna Bethune, she founded the Orphan Asylum Society. Schuyler was appointed second directress, or vice-president. In 1821, she was named first directress, and served for 27 years in this role, until she left New York in 1848. In those roles, she raised funds, collected needed goods, and oversaw the care and education of over 700 children. By the time she left she had been with the organization continuously since its founding, a total of 42 years. The New York Orphan Asylum Society continues to exist as a social service agency for children, today called Graham Windham. Schuyler's philanthropic work in helping create the Orphan Asylum Society has led to her induction into the philanthropy section of the National Museum of American History, showcasing the early generosity of Americans that reformed the nation.

Schuyler also defended her late husband against his critics in a variety of ways following his death, including by supporting his claim of authorship of George Washington's Farewell Address and by requesting an apology from James Monroe over his accusations of financial improprieties. Schuyler wanted a full official apology from Monroe, which he did not give until they met in person to talk about Hamilton shortly before his death. In 1846, Schuyler petitioned Congress to publish her husband's writings.

Schuyler remained dedicated to preserving her husband's legacy. She re-organized all of his letters, papers, and writings with the help of her son, John Church Hamilton, and persevered through many setbacks in getting his biography published. With Schuyler's help, John C. Hamilton would go on to publish History of the Republic of the United States America, as Traced in the Writings of Alexander Hamilton and his Contemporaries. History of the Republic would set the bar for multiple future biographies of Alexander Hamilton that were written over time. Schuyler was so devoted to Hamilton's writings that she wore a small package around her neck containing the pieces of a sonnet that Alexander wrote for her during the early days of their courtship. Her efforts permitted modern historians the access they have today to the writings of Alexander Hamilton.

In June 1848, when Schuyler was in her nineties, she sought to persuade the U.S. Congress to purchase and publish her late husband's works. In August, her request was granted, and Congress bought and published Alexander's works, adding them to the Library of Congress. Along with ensuring that Alexander's works were maintained and stored by the federal government, she remained dedicated to charity work. After moving to Washington, D.C., she helped Dolley Madison and Louisa Adams raise money to build the Washington Monument.

== Death ==
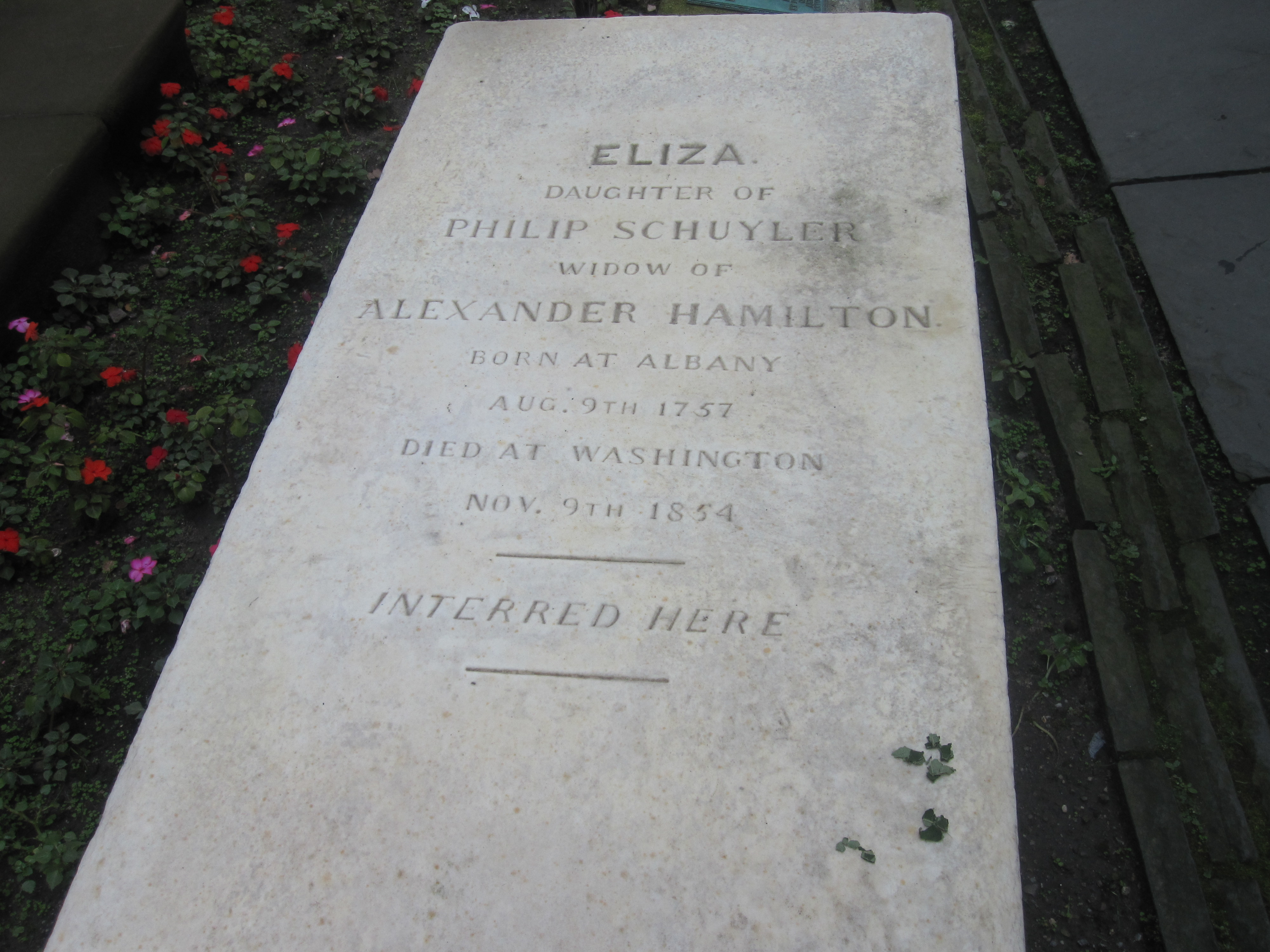
Schuyler's grave at Trinity Church

Beginning in 1846, Schuyler was suffering from short-term memory loss, but still vividly recalled her husband. On November 9, 1854, Schuyler died in Washington, D.C., at age 97. She outlived her husband by 50 years and had outlived all but one of her siblings: her youngest sister, Catherine, 24 years her junior.

Schuyler was interred near her husband in Trinity Church graveyard in Manhattan. Angelica was also laid to rest at Trinity, in the Livingstons' private vault, and Schuyler's eldest son Philip was buried in an unmarked grave near the churchyard.

== Children ==
Elizabeth Schuyler and Alexander Hamilton had eight children:

- Philip (January 22, 1782 – November 23, 1801), who was killed in a duel three years before his father's fatal duel
- Angelica (September 25, 1784 – February 6, 1857), who suffered a mental breakdown after her older brother's death and lived to the age of 72 in a state described as "eternal childhood", unable to care for herself
- Alexander, Jr. (May 16, 1786 – August 2, 1875)
- James Alexander (April 14, 1788 – September 24, 1878), who acted as Secretary of State for 23 days in March 1829
- John Church (August 22, 1792 – July 25, 1882)
- William Stephen (August 4, 1797 – October 9, 1850)
- Eliza (November 20, 1799 – October 17, 1859), who married Sidney Augustus Holly
- Philip, also called "Little Phil" (June 2, 1802 – July 9, 1884), named after his older brother who had died one year before his birth

The Hamiltons also raised Frances (Fanny) Antill, an orphan who lived with them for ten years beginning in 1787 when she was 2 years old.

== In popular culture ==
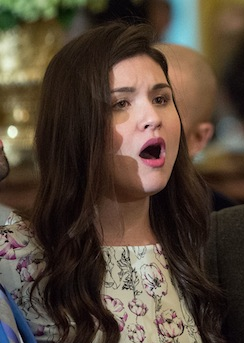
Schuyler was originally portrayed in the 2015 Broadway musical Hamilton by Phillipa Soo.

- Doris Kenyon portrayed Schuyler in the 1931 film Alexander Hamilton.
- Schuyler appeared in the 1986 television series George Washington II: The Forging of a Nation, where she is affectionately called Betsy, portrayed by Eve Gordon.
- Schuyler was portrayed in the 2015 Broadway musical Hamilton. The role was originated by Phillipa Soo, who received a 2016 Tony Award nomination for her work in the show. Schuyler's depiction in the musical has attracted praise from critics and commentators for emphasizing both her importance in her husband's life and her own work in propagating his legacy, an approach it shares with its inspiration and source, Ron Chernow's 2004 biography of Alexander Hamilton. Eliza has also been portrayed in the Broadway company of Hamilton by Denee Benton, and in touring companies by Solea Pfeiffer. Rachelle Ann Go originated the role in the West End production in London.

== See also ==
- Schuyler family
