= Philip Hamilton =

Eldest child of Alexander Hamilton (1782–1801)

Philip Schuyler Hamilton
- Born: January 22, 1782; Albany, New York, U.S.
- Died: November 24, 1801 (aged 19); New York City, New York, U.S.
- Cause of death: Gunshot wound
- Resting place: Trinity Church Cemetery (Lower Manhattan, New York City)
- Education: Columbia College (BA)
- Parent(s): Alexander Hamilton; Elizabeth Schuyler Hamilton
- Relatives: Hamilton family; Schuyler family

Philip Schuyler Hamilton known as Philip Hamilton I (January 22, 1782 – November 24, 1801) was the eldest child of Alexander Hamilton (the first U.S. Secretary of the Treasury) and Elizabeth Schuyler Hamilton. He died at age 19, fatally shot in a duel with George Eacker.

== Birth and early childhood ==
Philip Hamilton was born in Albany, New York, on January 22, 1782. His father, Alexander Hamilton, was the first U.S. Secretary of the Treasury and one of the Founding Fathers of the United States. His mother, Elizabeth Schuyler Hamilton, named her firstborn after her father, Philip Schuyler, who served as a Continental Army general under George Washington.

In Spring 1782, Alexander Hamilton wrote that Philip was a "fine boy", and that his birth was "attended with all the omens of future greatness," and continued to express high expectations and hopes for the future of his firstborn:

You reproach me with not having said enough about our little stranger. When I wrote last I was not sufficiently acquainted with him to give you his character. I may now assure you... [h]e is truly a very fine young gentleman, the most agreeable in his conversation and manners of any I ever knew—nor less remarkable for his intelligence and sweetness of temper. You are not to imagine by my beginning with his mental qualifications that he is defective in personal. It is agreed on all hands, that he is handsome, his features are good, his eye is not only sprightly and expressive but it is full of benignity. His attitude in sitting is by connoisseurs esteemed graceful and he has a method of waving his hand that announces the future orator. He stands however rather awkwardly and his legs have not all the delicate slimness of his fathers. It is feared He may never excel as much in dancing which is probably the only accomplishment in which he will not be a model. If he has any fault in manners, he laughs too much. He has now passed his Seventh Month.

— Alexander Hamilton's August 27, 1782 letter to Richard Kidder Meade, describing then seven-month-old Philip Hamilton

== Education ==
Late in 1791, at the age of nine, Philip was sent to attend a boarding school in Trenton, New Jersey, studying with William Frazer, an Episcopal clergyman and rector of St. Michael's Church. In early December that year, his father wrote encouragingly from Philadelphia:

Your Master also informs me that you recited a lesson the first day you began, very much to his satisfaction. I expect every letter from him will give me a fresh proof of your progress. For I know that you can do a great deal, if you please, and I am sure you have too much spirit not to exert yourself, that you may make us every day more and more proud of you.

By 1794, his younger brother Alexander Jr., then eight years old, joined him at the boarding school.

Philip enrolled in Columbia College, where his knowledge and enthusiasm were compared to that of his father, already a renowned alumnus. Robert Troup, a family friend who had been Alexander Hamilton's college roommate, wrote that Philip "was very promising in genius and acquirements, and Hamilton formed high expectations of his future greatness!" Troup wrote privately, however, that despite Hamilton's certainty that Philip was destined for greatness, "alas Philip is a sad rake and I have serious doubts whether he would ever be an honour to his family or his country."

Philip graduated with honors from Columbia College in 1800, and went on to study law. His father prescribed rigorous study routines, including waking for study at 6 o'clock every day from April through September, and not later than 7 o'clock for the rest of the year, after which, "From the time he is dressed in the morning til nine o'clock (the time for breakfast excluded) he is to read law."

== Duel and death ==
On July 4, 1801, a New York lawyer named George Eacker gave an Independence Day speech hosted by a New York State Militia brigade and by the Tammany Society. The Tammany Society, better known as Tammany Hall, was a Democratic-Republican party political organization that Aaron Burr had built into a political machine. In the speech, Eacker reportedly said that Alexander Hamilton would not be opposed to overthrowing Thomas Jefferson's presidency by force.

Four months later, on November 20, 1801, Philip and a friend named Stephen Price encountered Eacker while attending a play at the Park Theatre. Philip confronted Eacker about the speech, and in the ensuing disturbance, Eacker was heard to call Philip and Price "damned rascals". In response to the verbal hostilities and Eacker's insult, the two formally challenged Eacker to a duel. Acquaintances wrote that Alexander Hamilton counseled his son, telling him to engage in a delope, throwing away his first shot.

The duel took place in Paulus Hook, New Jersey (today Jersey City), a few miles from where the elder Hamilton would later be mortally wounded in a duel with Burr. Eacker faced Philip and Price separately, dueling Price the day after the challenge, and Philip the following day. In Eacker's duel with Price, neither party was injured, but four shots were fired. The next day, November 23, 1801, Philip took his father's advice, and refused to raise his pistol to fire after he and Eacker had counted ten paces and faced each other. Eacker, following suit, did not shoot either. For the first minute, both men stood, doing nothing, both refusing to shoot. After a minute, Eacker finally raised his pistol, and Philip did the same. Eacker shot and struck Philip above his right hip. The bullet went through his body and lodged in his arm. In what may have been an involuntary spasm, Philip also fired his pistol before he hit the ground, but this bullet did nothing.

As Philip fell on the ground bleeding, he displayed, as described by both sides, exemplary poise and dignity. "His manner on the ground was calm and composed beyond expression," the New York Post reported. "The idea of his own danger seemed to be lost in anticipation of the satisfaction which he might receive from the final triumph of his generous moderation." Philip was then rushed across the river to the home of his aunt, Angelica Schuyler Church, in Manhattan. She wrote, "His conduct was extraordinary during this trial."

Upon hearing of the events, Alexander Hamilton rushed to the home of Dr. David Hosack. Hosack's family told Hamilton that he, having already heard about the duel, had already left for the Churchs' home in Manhattan where Philip had been taken. The doctor later reported that Alexander "was so much overcome by his anxiety that he fainted and remained some time in my family before he was sufficiently recovered to proceed" to the Church home to see his son. When Hamilton arrived, he observed the pale and ashen appearance of Philip's face and tested his pulse. According to Hosack, "he instantly turned from the bed and, taking me by the hand, which he grasped with all the agony of grief, he exclaimed in a tone and manner that can never be effaced from my memory, 'Doctor, I despair.'" Philip's mother and Hamilton stayed beside Philip through the night. After making a profession of faith, Philip died at 5:00 am, fourteen hours after the initial wound.

Philip was buried on a stormy day, with many mourners in attendance. It was reported that as Hamilton approached his son's grave, he had to be held up by friends and family, due to grief. Philip's unmarked grave is near the graves of his parents and Aunt Angelica, in the churchyard of Trinity Church in New York City.

== Aftermath ==
Following Philip's death, his family fell into disarray. His 17-year-old sister, Angelica Hamilton, suffered a mental breakdown from which she never recovered; her mental state deteriorated until she became only intermittently lucid, and she sometimes could not even recognize family members. She spent the rest of her life in a state described as "eternal childhood," often talking to her brother as if he were still alive.

After his son's death, the elder Hamilton "plunged into a state of grief from which he never fully recovered" until his own death three years later.

== Legacy ==
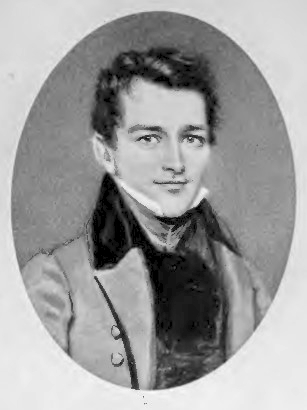
Portrait of Hamilton's younger brother, William, often mistaken to depict Philip

A portrait of Hamilton's younger brother, William S. Hamilton, is commonly mistaken to depict Philip. This misidentification comes from The Intimate Life of Alexander Hamilton, a biography penned by Philip's nephew, Allan McLane Hamilton, in 1919, in which the portrait is mistakenly captioned "Philip Hamilton (The First): age 20". However, a photograph of the portrait, which is kept in the collection of the Wisconsin Historical Society, was identified to depict William in a letter dated 1880 from the younger Philip.

Hamilton features in the 2015 Broadway musical Hamilton, based on the life of his father. The role of Philip was originated by Anthony Ramos. Philip has also been portrayed in the Broadway company of Hamilton by Jordan Fisher.
