= Alexander Hamilton (disambiguation) =

Alexander Hamilton (1755 or 1757–1804) was a Founding Father of the United States and served as its first Secretary of the Treasury.

Alexander Hamilton may also refer to:

== People ==
=== Government and military ===
- Alexander Hamilton of Innerwick (fl. 16th-century), Scottish landowner and supporter of Mary, Queen of Scots
- Alexander Hamilton (Bombay Marine officer) (before 1688–after 1733), Scottish sea captain, commander of the Bombay Marine
- Alexander Hamilton (of Ballincrieff) (1684–1763), Scottish politician, MP for Linlithgowshire 1727–1741
- Alexander Hamilton (died 1768), Irish MP for Killyleagh
- Alexander Hamilton (died 1809), Irish MP for Ratoath, Carrickfergus and Belfast
- Alexander Hamilton (British Army officer) (1765–1838), British soldier of the Napoleonic Wars
- Alexander Hamilton, 10th Duke of Hamilton (1767–1852), Scottish politician
- Alexander Hamilton Jr. (1786–1875), American colonel and New York City lawyer, son of founding father Alexander Hamilton
- Alexander Hamilton (general) (1815–1907), American Civil War general, grandson of founding father Alexander Hamilton
- Alexander Hamilton (Australian politician) (1816–1869), member of the New South Wales Legislative Assembly
- Alexander Hamilton Jr. (1816–1889), New York City lawyer, Civil War aide-de-camp, grandson of founding father
- Alexander Hamilton, 10th Lord Belhaven and Stenton (1840–1920), Scottish politician
- Alex Cole-Hamilton (born 1977), Scottish MSP

=== Science and medicine ===
- Alexander Hamilton (Maryland doctor) (1712–1756), Scottish-born doctor and writer in colonial Maryland
- Alexander Hamilton (Scottish physician) (1739–1802), co-founder of the Royal Society of Edinburgh
- Alexander Hamilton (linguist) (1762–1824), Sanskrit scholar
- Alexander Greenlaw Hamilton (1852–1941), Australian biologist
- Alexander R. Hamilton (born 1967), British physicist

=== Sports ===
- Alexander Hamilton (footballer, born 1865) (1865–?), Scottish footballer
- Alex Hamilton (footballer, born 1936) (1936–1990), Scottish footballer
- Alex Hamilton (footballer, born 1937) (1937–2009), Scottish footballer
- Alex Hamilton (basketball) (born 1993), American basketball player

=== Others ===
- Alexander Hamilton (priest) (1847–1928), American Episcopalian priest, great-grandson of founding father
- Alexander Hamilton (Virginia lawyer) (1851–1916), lawyer and railroad executive
- Alexander Morgan Hamilton (1903–1970), American philanthropist and civil servant
- Alexander Hamilton (bishop) (1915–2001), bishop of Jarrow in the Church of England
- Alistair Hamilton (Alexander Macdonald Hamilton, 1925–2012), president of the Law Society of Scotland; vice-Chairman of the Royal Bank of Scotland
- Alexander Hamilton (artist) (born 1950), Scottish artist, publisher and editor
- Alexander James Hamilton, British environmental artist

== Ships ==
- PS Alexander Hamilton, a steamboat built for the Hudson River Day Line in 1924
- USCGC Alexander Hamilton, a U.S. Coast Guard cutter commissioned in 1937
- USS Alexander Hamilton (SSBN-617), a United States Lafayette-class ballistic missile submarine
- USS Alexander Hamilton, a list of ships

== Visual arts ==
- Alexander Hamilton (Ceracchi), a 1794 marble bust by Giuseppe Ceracchi
- Alexander Hamilton (Trumbull), a 1792 painting by John Trumbull
- Statue of Alexander Hamilton (Central Park), an 1880 granite statue by Carl Conrads
- Statue of Alexander Hamilton (Columbia University), a 1908 sculpture by William Ordway Partridge
- Statue of Alexander Hamilton (Washington, D.C.), a 1923 bronze statue by James Earle Fraser

== Other uses ==
- Alexander Hamilton (book), a 2004 book by Ron Chernow
- Alexander Hamilton (film), a 1931 film biography
- "Alexander Hamilton" (song), a song from the 2015 musical Hamilton

== See also ==
- Alexander Douglas-Hamilton, 16th Duke of Hamilton (born 1978), premier peer of Scotland
- Alexander Hamilton-Gordon (British Army officer, born 1817) (1817–1890), soldier and MP
- Alexander Hamilton-Gordon (British Army officer, born 1859) (1859–1939), soldier, son of the above
- Alexander Hamilton High School (disambiguation)
- Alexandra Hamilton (disambiguation)
- Hamilton (musical), a 2015 Broadway musical
- Hamilton (play), a 1917 Broadway play
