= Schuyler Hamilton Jr. =

American architect (1853–1907)

- Born: January 4, 1853; Washington, D.C., U.S.
- Died: February 13, 1907 (aged 54); Norwalk, Connecticut, U.S.
- Resting place: Green-Wood Cemetery, Brooklyn
- Education: Columbia College
- Spouses: Gertrude Van Cortlandt Wells (m. 1877; div. 1894) Jane Byrd Mercer (m. 1895; died 1899) E. G. Hubbard (m. 1902)
- Children: 5
- Parent(s): Schuyler Hamilton; Cornelia Ray
- Relatives: See Hamilton family

Schuyler Hamilton Jr. (January 4, 1853 – February 13, 1907) was an American architect and the great-grandson of Alexander Hamilton.

== Early life ==
He was the son of Schuyler Hamilton (1822–1903) and Cornelia Ray (1829–1867). His father, a General during the Civil War, remarried in 1886 to Louisa Francis Paine Allen (1832-1898) at the Park Hotel in Manhattan. He had two brothers, Robert Ray Hamilton (1851–1890), who served in the New York State Assembly, and Charles Althrop Hamilton (1858–1875), who died aged 17.

His maternal grandparents were Robert Ray (1794–1879), a merchant, and Cornelia Prime (1800–1874). His paternal grandparents were John Church Hamilton (1792–1882) and Maria Eliza van den Heuvel. His paternal great-grandparents included Alexander Hamilton (1755/7–1804), a Founding Father of the United States, Elizabeth Schuyler (1757–1854), and Baron John Cornelius van den Heuvel, the one-time governor of Dutch Guiana. Through his aunt Elizabeth Hamilton (1831–1884), he was the nephew of Gen. Henry Wager Halleck and Gen. George Washington Cullum.

== Career ==
Hamilton graduated from Columbia College, first from the art department in 1872, and then from the science department in 1876.

Following his graduation, he trained and became an architect, earning a reputation for "skill and praiseworthy originality."

Following Hamilton's divorce in 1894, he rented a cottage in Newport, Rhode Island the following summer and after it closed on August 1, 1895, he stated that he was going west to California to engage in mining. In January 1898, he filed a petition for bankruptcy, showing nominal assets of $115,361 in a "reversionary interest" in the estate of his brother, Robert Ray Hamilton, who committed suicide in 1890.

Hamilton was a member of the University Club of New York, the St. Anthony Club, the Sons of the American Revolution and the Columbia University Alumni Association.

== Personal life ==
On April 11, 1877, Hamilton married Gertrude Van Cortlandt Wells (1849–1944), daughter of Alexander Wells (1819–1854), an Associate Justice of the Supreme Court of California, in Ossining, New York. Before their divorce in 1894, they were the parents of:

- Violet Loring Hamilton (1882–1936), who married Austin Sherwood Rothwell (1890–1941), son of John Rothwell, in 1917.
- Schuyler Van Cortlandt Hamilton (b. 1884), who married Virginia Marshall, an actress, in 1909.
- Gertrude Ray Hamilton (1887–1961), who married Paul Leavenworth McCulloch (1887–1962)
- Helena Van Wyck Hamilton (1888–1888), who died young.
- Lillian Gardiner Hamilton (1890–1890), who died young.

Shortly after their divorce, she married the Baron Raoul Nicholas de Graffenried thereby becoming the Baroness de Graffenried, and Hamilton married Jane Byrd Mercer (1867–1899), the daughter of Richard Sprigg Mercer (1823–1873) and the granddaughter of Governor John Francis Mercer of Maryland, in 1895. During their marriage, they generally spent their summers in Europe, generally at Dinard, France, where Hamilton had a villa. They remained married until her death, due to an overdose of morphine at her home in the Florence Apartment House, in 1899.

In January 1902, he married for the third time to Mrs. E. G. Hebbard, the widow of Rev. Dr. George P. Hebbard of South Norwalk, Connecticut, an Episcopalian clergyman who fell from a train and was killed.

Hamilton died from an acute attack of Bright's disease on February 13, 1907. He was buried at Green-Wood Cemetery in Brooklyn, New York.
