= Edmund L. Baylies =

American lawyer

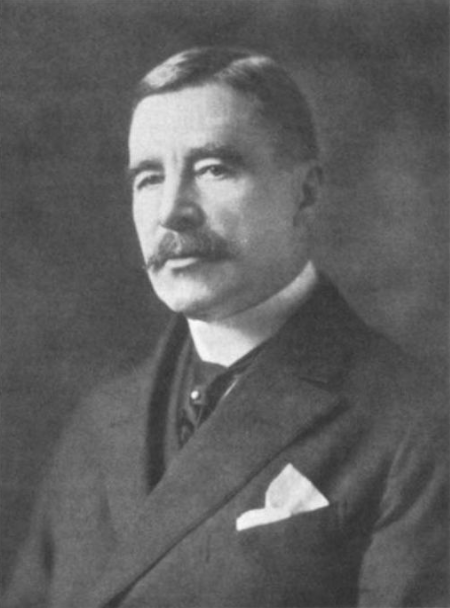
- Born: Edmund Lincoln Baylies, Jr. December 2, 1857; New York City, U.S.
- Died: April 29, 1932 (aged 74); New York City, U.S.
- Education: Harvard College; Harvard Law School; Columbia Law School
- Employer: Carter Ledyard & Milburn
- Spouse: Louisa Van Rensselaer (m. 1887)
- Relatives: Elizabeth Livingston (cousin); Schuyler Hamilton (uncle); Robert Ray Hamilton (cousin); Francis Cabot Lowell (brother-in-law)

Edmund Lincoln Baylies, Jr. (December 2, 1857 – April 29, 1932) was a New York City lawyer, philanthropist, and member of New York Society during the Gilded Age.

== Early life ==
Baylies was born in New York on December 2, 1857. He was the eldest child of Edmund Lincoln Baylies (1829–1869), a merchant and philanthropist, and Nathalie Elizabeth Ray (1837–1912). He was the brother of Cornelia Prime Ray, who married Judge Francis Cabot Lowell; Walter Cabot Baylies, a president of the Edison Electric Illuminating Company who married Charlotte Upham; in 1888, and Ruth Baylies.

His maternal grandparents were Cornelia (née Prime) Ray (the daughter of Nathaniel Prime) and Robert Ray, the brother-in-law of New York Gov. John Alsop King. His paternal grandparents were Edmund Baylies (a cousin of U.S. Representative Francis Baylies) and Eliza Ann (née Payson) Baylies. Through his father's family, he was descended from Benjamin Lincoln, the Revolutionary War general and aide-de-camp to Washington, and Thomas Baylies, who emigrated to the America in 1737. His aunt, Ruth Baylies, was married to Maturin Livingston Jr., the son of Maturin Livingston, making Elizabeth Livingston, the wife of George Cavendish-Bentinck, and her twin sister, Ruth T. Livingston, the wife of Ogden Mills, his first cousins. Another aunt, Cornelia Ray, was married to Maj. Gen. Schuyler Hamilton, son of John Church Hamilton and grandson of Alexander Hamilton, making Robert Ray Hamilton, his first cousins.

Baylies graduated from Harvard College, with an A.B., in 1879 and then from Harvard Law School, with an L.L.B., in 1882. He also obtained an LL.D. from Columbia Law School in 1882.

== Career ==
After graduating from law school, he spent a year traveling around the globe, and then joined Scudder & Carter, a firm founded by Henry Joel Scudder and James C. Carter. In 1895, Baylies, who focused on real estate, became partner at the firm, then known as Carter & Ledyard, after the admission of Lewis Cass Ledyard. He retired from the firm in 1926, which was then known as Carter Ledyard & Milburn, following the addition of John G. Milburn in 1904. He was also personal counsel to Cornelius Vanderbilt III.

In 1896, he spoke before the House Committee on Interstate and Foreign Commerce in support of the bill to establish a cable between the United States and the Hawaiian Islands.

He was a president of the Vanderbilt Hotel Corporation, a director of the Metropolitan Opera Company, All America Cables, Inc., the Eastern Steel Company, a trustee of the Atlantic Mutual Insurance Company, and vice-president and trustee of the Green-Wood Cemetery.

Baylies was associated with the Seamen's Church Institute for 47 years. He served as the Institute's counsel from 1892 to 1915 and was chairman of the executive committee from 1905 until he became president in 1913. In the January preceding his death, was made honorary lay president. He was a member of the New-York Historical Society and the Massachusetts Society of the Cincinnati.

=== Society life ===
In 1892, Baylies and his wife were both included in Ward McAllister's "Four Hundred", purported to be an index of New York's best families, published in The New York Times.

Baylies was a member of the Knickerbocker Club, the University Club, the Century Association, the Harvard Club, the Riding Club and the New York Yacht Club.

== Personal life ==
On January 18, 1887, Baylies was married to Louisa Van Rensselaer (1865–1945) at St. Thomas Church in Manhattan. She was the daughter of Alexander Van Rensselaer (1814–1878) and his second wife, Louisa (née Barnewall) Van Rensselaer. Her paternal grandparents were Stephen Van Rensselaer III, the Patroon of Rensselaerwyck, and Cornelia Bell Paterson, the daughter of William Paterson, the 2nd Governor of New Jersey. In 1917, after his death, his wife received the Legion of Honour in recognition of her work for France.

In 1919, he suffered from double pneumonia and traveled to the Virginia Hot Springs for recovery.

Baylies died at his home on 10 East 62nd Street in Manhattan on April 29, 1932. He was buried at Green-Wood Cemetery in Brooklyn, New York. The pallbearers included Columbia University President Nicholas Murray Butler, Gen. Cornelius Vanderbilt III, Stephen Baker, Walter W. Parsons, Henry Parrish, Allison V. Armour, Charles D. Wetmore, Henry B. Anderson, Frank Gray Griswold, and Frank L. Polk. The ushers were Herbert Robbins, Percy Pyne, Henry Hill Anderson, Whitney Warren, Le Roy King, Henry Bull, and George Pendelton. His widow died on December 1, 1945, at Hamstead Marshall in Newbury, England, where she was living with the Countess of Craven, formerly Cornelia Martin who was the widow of William Craven, 4th Earl of Craven and the daughter of Bradley Martin.
