= Jan Cornelis Van den Heuvel =

Dutch politician (1742–1826)

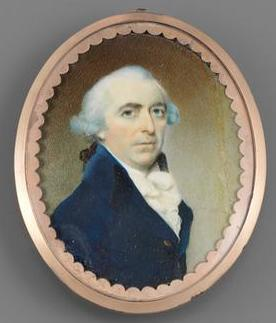

Governor of Demerara
- In office 1765–1770
- Preceded by: Laurens Lodewijk van Bercheijk
- Succeeded by: Paulus van Schuylenburgh

Personal details
- Born: December 23, 1742 Maastricht, Limburg, Dutch Republic
- Died: May 6, 1826 (aged 83) New York City, New York, U.S.
- Spouse(s): Maria Catharina Storm van 's Gravesande (died 1771) Frederica Henrietta Justina van Baerle (died 1793) Charlotte Augusta Apthorp (m. 1794; died 1823)
- Parent(s): Abraham van den Heuvel; Jacoba Johanna Henrietta Hesselt van Dinter
- Relatives: Colin M. Ingersoll (grandson); Charles Ingersoll (grandson); Ralph Ingersoll (son-in-law); John Hamilton (son-in-law)

Baron Jan Cornelis van den Heuvel (Note: Once in America, he started going by John Cornelius Van den Heuvel) (December 23, 1742 – May 6, 1826) was a Dutch born plantation owner and politician who served as governor of the Dutch province of Demerara from 1765 to 1770 and later became a merchant in New York City with the Dutch West India Company.

== Early life ==
Van den Heuvel was born on December 23, 1742, in Maastricht in the province of Limburg, Netherlands. He was the son of Abraham van den Heuvel and Jacoba Johanna Henrietta Hesselt (née van Dinter).

His paternal grandparents were Jacob van den Heuvel and Hermanna Henrica Cuper. His maternal grandparents were Andres Matthias Hesfelt van Dinter and Jacoba Henrietta Martini.

== Career ==
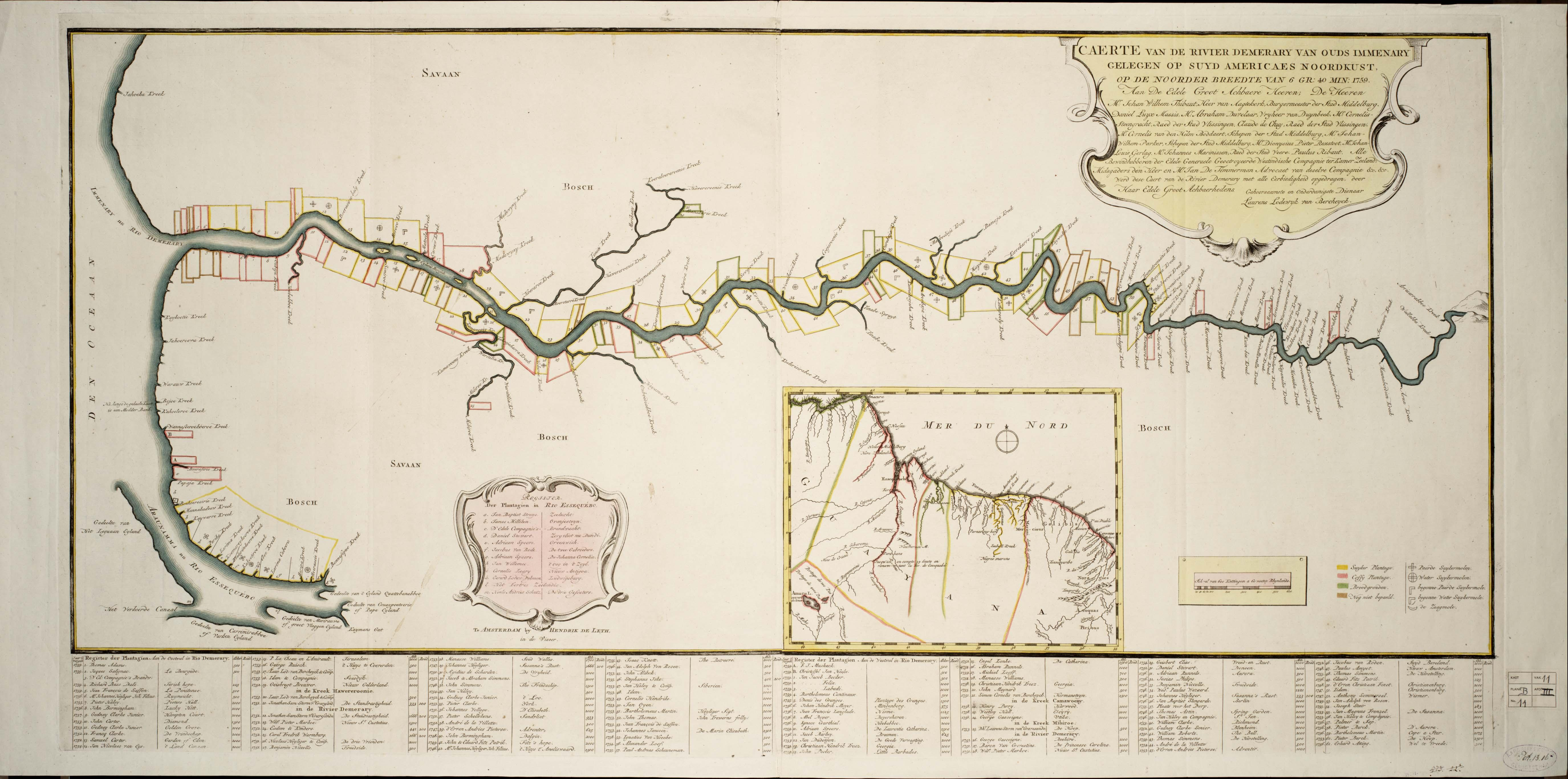
The Demerara colony in 1759 (East is at the top).

In 1765, Van den Heuvel was appointed Commander (an equivalent to the colonial governor) of Demerara, which was a historical region in the Guianas on the north coast of South America (which is now part of the country of Guyana) located around the lower courses of the Demerara River. In Demerara, he owned two plantations.

At the time, it had been a Dutch colony since 1745 when it was separated from Essequibo. Van den Heuvel served until 1770 Demerara would remain mostly under Dutch rule until around 1812 when it merged into Demerara-Essequibo and was ceded to Britain by treaty between the Netherlands and Britain, becoming known as the county of British Guiana from 1838 to 1966. Its main town was Georgetown (which was known as Stabroek during Dutch rule).

=== Life in America ===
In 1790, due to the outbreak of yellow fever, he moved to New York City, first at 87 Liberty Street, as a merchant with the Dutch West India Company. In 1800, he moved to the corner of Broadway and Barclay Streets (which is the present site of the Woolworth Building).

In 1801, he was elected a director of the U.S. Branch Bank of which "Cornelius Ray was president and Robert Lenox, Nicholas Low, John Murray, Gabriel W. Ludlow, William Laurence, Thomas Pearsall, David M. Clarkson, Peter Schermerhorn, Thomas Buchanan, John Laurence and Moses Rogers were his associated directors."

== Personal life ==
Van den Heuvel was married to Maria Catharina Storm van 's Gravesande (1734–1771), the daughter of Laurens Storm van 's Gravesande and Lumea Constantia van Bercheyck. They were the parents of:

- Anna Maria Eleonora van den Heuvel, who married Pieter van Westrenen (1768–1845), who served as the Dutch Ambassador to Sweden and Portugal.

After his first wife's death, he was married to Frederica Henrietta Justina van Baerle (1755–1793), the daughter of Karel van Baerle. In 1792, just one year before her death, she purchased 400 acres from James McEvers in the Bloomingdale area of upper Manhattan. They were the parents of:

- Isaac Guysbertus Herman van den Heuvel, who lived at The Hague.
- Jacob Adrian van den Heuvel, an author and state assemblyman from St. Lawrence County in New York.
- Charlotte Gertrude van den Heuvel (1785–1868), who married Scottish born Colin Macrae (1776–1854), a descendant of Farquhar Macrae of Clan Macrae.
- Margaret Catharine Eleanora Van den Heuvel (1790–1878), who married Ralph Isaacs Ingersoll (1789–1872), a U.S. Representative from Connecticut who also served as the U.S. Minister to the Russian Empire under President James K. Polk.

After Frederica's death upon his relation to the United States, he remarried to Charlotte Augusta Apthorp in 1794. Margaret was the daughter of prominent New York landowner Charles Ward Apthorp and his wife, Mary (née McEvers) Apthorp. Together, they were the parents of:

- Maria Eliza van den Heuvel (1795–1873), who married John Church Hamilton (1792−1882), the son of U.S. Treasury Secretary Alexander Hamilton.
- Charles Apthorp van den Heuvel (d. 1879), who married Mary Morris (1800−1885), the daughter of U.S. Representative Thomas Morris.
- Susan Augusta Van den Heuvel (1805–1884), who married Thomas Stanyarne Gibbes II of South Carolina.
- Justine van den Heuvel, who married Samuel Gouverneur Bibby (1790–1849).

Van den Heuvel died on May 6, 1826, in New York City. In his 1822 will, he gave his wife, "the gift to her of the use of his farm and mansion at Bloomingdale so long as she should remain his widow," however, she died three years before he did and instead of dividing the property, his children sold it in its entirety to Francis Price in 1827.

=== Descendants ===
Through his daughter Charlotte, he was the grandfather of Robert Campbell Macrae (1822–1896), who married Jane Eliza Currie (1830–1913), daughter of British explorer Vice-Admiral Mark John Currie.

Through his daughter Margaret, he was the grandfather of seven, including John Van den Heuvel Ingersoll (1815–1846), a Yale educated lawyer who edited a political paper in Ohio and served as secretary of the Indian Commission, Colin Macrae Ingersoll (1819–1903), who was a member of Congress from Connecticut from 1851 to 1855 (who married Julia Harriet Pratt, the daughter of U.S. Representative Zadock Pratt). and Charles Roberts Ingersoll (1821–1903), who served as Governor of Connecticut from 1873 to 1877 (who married Virginia Gregory, the daughter of Admiral Francis Gregory)

Through his daughter Maria, he was the grandfather of fourteen, including General Alexander Hamilton (1815–1907), a major general in the Civil War, Charlotte Augusta Hamilton (1819–1896), John Cornelius Adrian Hamilton (1820–1879), Schuyler Hamilton (1822–1903), who served in the Mexican War, Maria Eliza Hamilton (1825–1887), who married Judge Charles A. Peabody (1814–1901) Charles Apthorp Hamilton (1826–1901), a judge of the circuit court for Milwaukee, Elizabeth Hamilton (1831–1884), who married Henry Wager Halleck in 1855 (and after his death, George Washington Cullum in 1875), William Gaston Hamilton (1832–1913), a consulting engineer of the Pennsylvania Railroad Company, Laurens Hamilton (1834–1858), who drowned accidentally while serving as part of a military escort aboard a ship returning the remains of President James Monroe to Richmond, Virginia.

Through his daughter Susan, he was the grandfather of Charlotte Augusta Gibbes (1825–1887), who married John Jacob Astor III (1822–1890).

Political offices
Preceded by Laurens Lodewijk van Bercheijk	Governor of Demerara; 1765–1770	Succeeded by Paulus van Schuylenburgh
