= Walter Howe (New York) =

American lawyer and politician

Member of the New York State Assembly from the New York County's 11th district
- In office January 1, 1883 – December 31, 1885
- Preceded by: J. Hampden Robb
- Succeeded by: Robert Ray Hamilton

Personal details
- Born: May 3, 1849 New York City, US
- Died: August 22, 1890 (aged 41) Newport, Rhode Island, US
- Party: Republican
- Spouse: Mary Anne Bruce Robins (m. 1873)
- Relations: William T. Jerome (brother-in-law); Walter Howe (grandson)
- Education: College of the City of New York; Columbia Law School

Walter Howe (May 3, 1849 – August 22, 1890) was an American lawyer and politician from New York.

== Early life ==
May 3, 1849 in Manhattan. He was the eldest child of Ann Elizabeth (née Massie) Howe (1824–1901) and Augustus Howe (1819–1888), a successful merchant who left the family in affluent circumstances. His siblings included Sarah Massie Howe, architect Augustus Howe Jr., Nicholas Murray Howe, Anne (née Howe) Hurin, and Albert Howe. Another sister, Lavinia Taylor Howe, was the wife of William Travers Jerome, the New York County District Attorney from 1902 to 1909. After his father's death, his mother resided at the family homestead in Elizabeth, New Jersey.

Howe graduated from the College of the City of New York in 1868 followed by Columbia Law School in 1870.

== Career ==
Howe was "a lawyer of wide acquaintance and unblemished reputation." He was first elected as a Republican to the New York State Legislature in 1882, representing the 11th District in the New York State Assembly in 1883 and serving in the 106th, 107th, and 108th Legislatures until December 31, 1885. In 1885, he ran for the New York State Senate, but was defeated by Democrat William C. Traphagen. Howe was succeeded in his Assembly seat by fellow Republican Robert Ray Hamilton (son of Gen. Schuyler Hamilton; grandson of John Church Hamilton; and great-grandson of Treasury Secretary Alexander Hamilton). In 1888, Mayor Abram Hewitt appointed Howe to serve as a member of the Aqueduct Commission of the City of New York.

After his death, his friend and former legislator Theodore Roosevelt (who had yet to become New York's Police Commissioner, Governor, or President) penned a tribute to Howe, writing:

"As a friend and former fellow-legislator of Walter Howe, I am unwilling to let his death pass without expressing in some public way my sense of what the city of New-York owes him. Although a man keenly appreciative of artistic and literary work, and himself fond of using both pen and brush, the services by which he especially rendered the city his debtor were done in public life."

== Personal life ==
In 1873, Howe was married to Mary Anne Bruce Robins (1850–1922), a daughter of George W. Robins and Margaret (née Bruce) Robins. Together, they lived at Madison Avenue and 34th Street in Manhattan and were the parents of two sons:

- Ernest Howe (1875–1932), a Connecticut State Assemblyman and State Senator who was editor of the American Journal of Science who married Anne Wilson (1880–1963), the first Republican state central committeewoman from the 30th Senatorial District after passage of the Women's Suffrage Amendment.
- Walter Bruce Howe (1879–1954), an international lawyer who married noted composer and pianist Mary Carlisle (1882–1964) in 1911.

He was a member of the Union League Club (where he served as Secretary), the Commonwealth Club, the Century, the University Club and the Downtown Club.

Howe drowned on August 22, 1890, while bathing at his summer residence (the former Glover Cottage which was next to Mayor Hewitt's cottage) on Beacon Hill near Castle Hill beach in Newport. After a funeral conducted by the Rev. George W. Douglass of Washington, Howe was buried at Island Cemetery in Newport. After his death, his widow remarried to Dr. Arnold Hague, a well known geologist, in November 1893. She died in Washington in January 1922.

=== Descendants ===
Through his son Ernest, he was posthumously a grandfather of Walter Howe (1907–1966), who served as Speaker of the Connecticut House of Representatives and President Eisenhower's Ambassador to Chile from 1958 to 1961, and Margaret Bruce Howe, the founder of the Prospect Press in Hartford who became the wife of Herbert L. Crapo, editor of the Litchfield Enquirer.

Through his son Walter, he was posthumously a grandfather of three, Dr. Bruce Howe, Dr. Calderon Howe, and Molly (née Howe) Lynn.

New York State Assembly
Preceded by J. Hampden Robb	New York State Assembly; New York County, 11th District; 1883–1885	Succeeded by Robert Ray Hamilton
