= Hamilton family =

Prominent American political family

Hamilton family of the United States
- Parent family: Clan Hamilton
- Current region: United States
- Origin: Scotland
- Members: Alexander Hamilton; Elizabeth Hamilton
- Connected families: Schuyler family Van Rensselaer family Morgan family Livingston family
- Motto: Viridis et fructifera (Latin for 'Verdant and fruitful')
- Estate: The Grange

The Hamiltons of the United States are a family of Scottish origin, whose most prominent member was Alexander Hamilton (1755/57–1804), one of the Founding Fathers of the United States. Their ancestors and relations in Scotland included the Lairds of Kerelaw Castle in Stevenston, North Ayrshire, of the Cambuskeith branch of Clan Hamilton.

== Background ==
Coat of arms of Hamilton of Grange
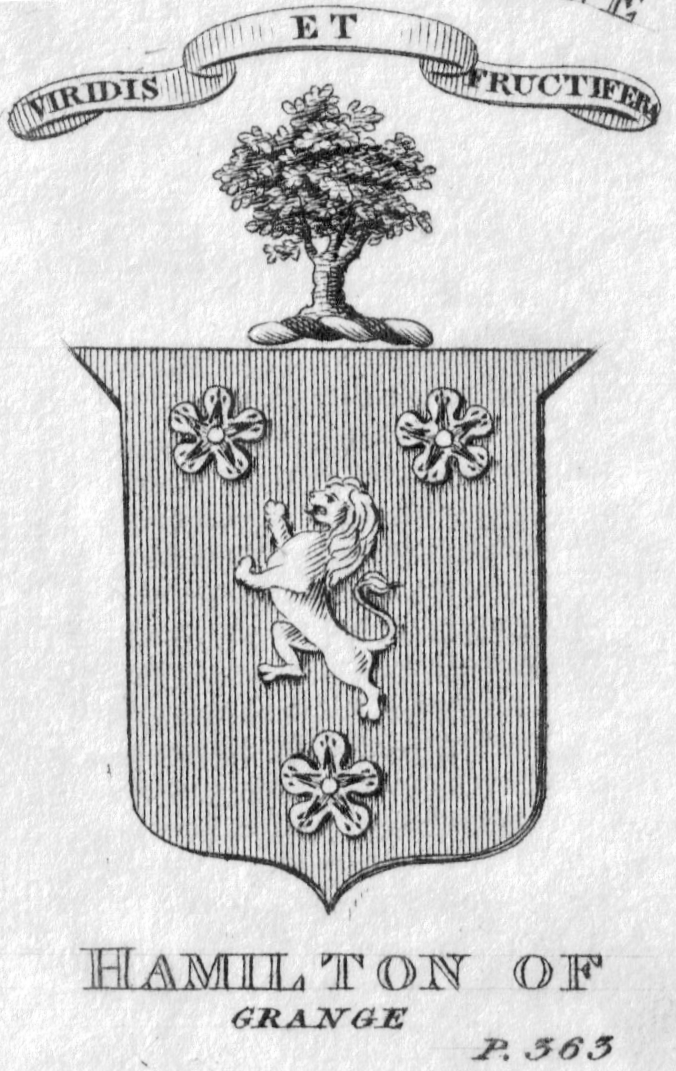

Versions
- Coat of arms of the Lairds of Hamilton of Grange in Ayrshire, Scotland, including Alexander Hamilton's paternal grandfather
- Shield: Gules, a lion rampant, argent, betwixt three cinquefoils, ermine

The paternal lineage of American founding father Alexander Hamilton was rooted in Scotland, where his relations were landed gentry known as the Hamiltons of Grange.

The Hamiltons of Grange descended from Walter de Hamilton, founder of the Cambuskeith branch of Clan Hamilton, who held lands in Edinburgh by a charter from Robert III of Scotland given between 1390 and 1406. The last Laird of the Hamiltons of Grange, who held the title from 1774 until his death in 1837, was Alexander Hamilton's first cousin, also named Alexander.

James Alexander Hamilton was born in Ayrshire, Scotland in 1718. He was the fourth son of Laird Alexander Hamilton of Grange. His mother, Elizabeth Pollock, was the eldest daughter of Sir Robert Pollock, 1st Baronet of Pollock. With little prospect of an inheritance in Scotland, James moved to the West Indies to become a merchant and businessman on the island of Saint Kitts. He and Rachel Faucette (who was of English and French descent), became the parents, out of wedlock, of Alexander Hamilton and his older brother James Hamilton Jr.

Alexander Hamilton moved in October 1772 to the Thirteen Colonies (later the United States) to earn an education. He later became the aide-de-camp to General George Washington and first Secretary of the Treasury. He married Elizabeth Schuyler, who was the daughter of Philip Schuyler and Catherine Van Rensselaer, both members of prominent Dutch-American families, the Schuyler and Van Rensselaer families. Elizabeth and Alexander Hamilton were married on December 14, 1780, at the Schuyler Mansion in Albany, New York. They went on to have eight children, thus establishing the Hamilton family in the United States.

== Notable members ==
The following list, organized by generation, begins with the establishment of Alexander Hamilton's family. It selectively includes notable descendants of Alexander and Eliza Hamilton.

=== First generation ===
- Alexander Hamilton (1755/1757–1804)
- Elizabeth Schuyler Hamilton (1757–1854)

=== Second generation (children) ===
- Philip Hamilton (1782–1801)
- Angelica Hamilton (1784–1857)
- Alexander Hamilton Jr. (1786–1875)
- James Alexander Hamilton (1788–1878)
- John Church Hamilton (1792–1882)
- William Stephen Hamilton (1797–1851)
- Eliza Hamilton Holly (1799–1859)
- Philip Hamilton II (1802–1884)

=== Third generation (grandchildren) ===
- Elizabeth Hamilton (1811–1863)
- Frances Hamilton (1813–1887)
- Alexander Hamilton (1815–1907)
- Alexander Hamilton Jr. (1816–1889)
- Maria Williamson Hamilton (1817–1822)
- Mary Morris Hamilton (1818–1877)
- Charlotte Augusta Hamilton (1818–1896)
- Angelica Hamilton (1819–1868)
- John Cornelius Adrian (1820–1879)
- Schuyler Hamilton (1822–1903)
- James Hamilton (1824–1825)
- Maria Eliza Hamilton (1825–1887)
- Charles Apthorp Hamilton (1826–1901)
- Robert P. Hamilton (1828–1891)
- Adelaide Hamilton (1830–1915)
- Elizabeth Hamilton (1831–1884)
- William Gaston Hamilton (1832–1913)
- Laurens Hamilton (1834–1858)
- Alice Hamilton (1838–1905)
- Louis McLane Hamilton (1844-1868)
- Allan McLane Hamilton (1848-1919)

=== Fourth generation (great-grandchildren) ===
- Louisa Lee Schuyler (1837-1926)
- Georgina Schuyler (1841-1923)
- Alexander Schuyler Hamilton (1847–1928)
- Alexander Hamilton III (1848-1848)
- Robert Ray Hamilton (1851–1890)
- Schuyler Hamilton Jr. (1853–1907)
- Henry Wager Halleck Jr. (1856-1882)
- Louis McLane Hamilton (1876–1911)

=== Fifth generation (great-great-grandchildren) ===
- Anne Adele Walton Hamilton (1873–1898)
- Alma Elizabeth Hamilton (b. 1877)
- Charlotte Maria Hamilton (1882–1907)
- Violet Loring Hamilton (1882–1936)
- Schuyler Van Cortlandt Hamilton (b. 1884)
- Esther Livermore Hamilton (1884–1884)
- Alexander Schuyler Hamilton Jr. (1886–1914)
- Gertrude Ray Hamilton (1887–1961)
- Helena Van Wyck Hamilton (1888–1888)
- Lillian Gardiner Hamilton (1890–1890)

=== Sixth generation (great-great-great-grandchildren) ===
- Elizabeth Schuyler McCulloch (1916–1968)
- Paul Leavenworth McCulloch (1920–1992)

== Family tree ==
The following partial family tree begins with the paternal grandfather of Alexander Hamilton, and includes both Scottish and American family members.

- Alexander Hamilton of Grange, Laird ∞ 1730: Elizabeth Pollock [daughter of Sir Robert Pollock, Baronet (1665–1735)]
  - John Hamilton of Grange (1712–1771)
  - Robert Hamilton of Grange (1715–1774)
  - Alexander Hamilton (b. 1717) ∞ Rachel Cunninghame [daughter of James Cunninghame of Collelan]
    - Alexander Hamilton of Grange, advocate (d. 1837)
    - Elizabeth Hamilton ∞ Robert Cunninghame of Auchenharvie
    - Margaret Hamilton ∞ Rev. Thomas Pollock
    - Joana (or Frances) Hamilton ∞ Edward M'Cormick
    - Jane Hamilton
  - James A. Hamilton (1718–1799) and Rachel Faucette (1729–1768) [previously married to Johann Michael Lavien] [daughter of John Fawcette, IV (1703–1745)]
    - James A. Hamilton Jr. (1753–1786) ∞ Courtney Bailey (b. 1760)
      - Franklin Hamilton
        - Benjamin Franklin Hamilton (1825–1898) ∞ (1) Elizabeth Nahragan (d. 1865); ∞ (2) Catherine Holley (1841–1919)
      - Mary Ann Courtney Hamilton (1802–1884) ∞ Thomas W. Tucker (1802–1881)
    - Alexander Hamilton (1755/7–1804) ∞ Elizabeth Schuyler (1757–1854) [daughter of Gen. Philip Schuyler (1733–1804) ∞ Catherine Van Rensselaer (1734–1803)]
      - Philip Hamilton (1782–1801)
      - Angelica Hamilton (1784–1857)
      - Alexander Hamilton Jr. (1786–1875) ∞ Eliza P. Knox (d. 1871)
      - James Alexander Hamilton (1788–1878) ∞ Mary Morris (d. 1869)
        - Elizabeth "Eliza" Hamilton (1811–1863) ∞ George Lee Schuyler (1811–1890) [son of Philip Jeremiah Schuyler]
        - Frances "Fanny" Hamilton (1813–1887) ∞ George Russel James Bowdoin (1809–1870)
        - Alexander Hamilton Jr. (1816–1889) ∞ Angelica Livingston (1820–1896) [daughter of Maturin Livingston]
          - Alexander Hamilton (1848–1849)
        - Mary Morris Hamilton (1818–1877) ∞ George Lee Schuyler (1811–1890)
        - Angelica Hamilton (1819–1868) ∞ Richard Milford Blatchford (1798–1875)
      - John Church Hamilton (1792–1882) ∞ Maria Eliza van den Heuvel (1795–1873)
        - Alexander Hamilton (1815–1907) ∞ Elizabeth Smith Nicoll (1819–1873)
          - Rev. Alexander Hamilton (1847–1928) ∞ Adele Walton Livermore (1849–1907)
            - Anne Adele Walton Hamilton (1873–1898) ∞ Gilva Burr Kellogg
              - Adele Spaulding Kellogg (b. 1895)
              - Gilva Lawrence Kellogg (b. 1897)
            - Alma Elizabeth Hamilton (1877–1878)
            - Charlotte Maria Hamilton (1882–1907)
            - Esther Livermore Hamilton (1884–1884)
            - Alexander Schuyler Hamilton III (1886–1914)
          - Henry Nicoll Hamilton (1849–1914) ∞ Mary Amelia Fish (1857–1898)
            - Katherine Nicoll Hamilton (1880–1957) ∞ Theodore Ethelbert Terrell (1878–1969)
            - Mary Hamilton (1886–1887)
            - Henry Beekman Hamilton (1888–1981) ∞ Dora L. Titus (1884–1924)
              - Edith M. Hamilton (1915–1987) ∞ Crossett Morgan (1909–1983)
              - William T. Hamilton (b. 1919)
            - Philip Schuyler Hamilton (1891–1927)
          - James Bowdoin Hamilton (1852–1853)
          - Marie Elizabeth Hamilton (1855–1897) ∞ Francis William Henderson (1825–1887)
        - Charlotte Augusta Hamilton (1819–1896)
        - John Cornelius Adrian Hamilton (1820–1879) ∞ Angeline Romer (1816–1888)
          - Edgar Augustus Hamilton (1841–1926) ∞ (1) Martha Ecob (1847–1884); ∞ (2) Carrie Rogers Tolfree (1844–1901)
            - Edgar Laurens Hamilton (1872–1950)
            - Grace Holmes Hamilton (1877–1931)
            - Alexander Hamilton (1878–1890)
            - Eleanor Ecob Hamilton (1881–1956)
          - John Cornelius Leon Hamilton (1842–1919) ∞ Sarah Francis Pugh (1843–1918)
            - Frank Hamilton (1866–1946) ∞ Minnie Haring (1867–1951)
              - William Haring Hamilton (1897–1934)
            - Mary Schuyler Hamilton (1870–1941)
            - Philip Lee Hamilton (1874–1947)
            - John Church Hamilton (1885–1953) ∞ Gladys L. Mayer (1897–1981)
        - Schuyler Hamilton (1822–1903) ∞ Cornelia Ray (d. 1867)
          - Robert Ray Hamilton (1851–1890) ∞ Evangeline L. Mann
          - Schuyler Hamilton Jr. (1853–1907) ∞ (1) Jane Bird Mercer (1867–1899); ∞ (2) Gertrude Van Cortlandt Wells (1849–1944) [daughter of Alexander Wells]
            - Violet Loring Hamilton (1882–1936) ∞ Austin Sherwood Rothwell (1890–1941)
            - Gertrude Ray Hamilton (1887–1961) ∞ Paul Leavenworth McCulloch (1887–1962)
            - Helena Van Wyck Hamilton (1888–1888)
            - Lillian Gardiner Hamilton (1890–1890)
          - Charles Althrop Hamilton (1858–1875)
        - Mary Eliza Hamilton (1825–1887) ∞ Charles Augustus Peabody (1814–1901)
        - Charles Apthorpe Hamilton (1826–1901) ∞ Julia F. Eliot (1828–1903)
          - Julia A. Hamilton (1860–1876)
        - Adelaide Hamilton (1830–1915)
        - Elizabeth Hamilton (1831–1884) ∞ (1) Henry Wager Halleck (1815–1872); ∞ (2) George Washington Cullum (1809–1892)
          - Henry Wager Hillock Jr. (1856–1882)
        - William Gaston Hamilton (1832–1913) ∞ (1) Helen Maria Pierson (1834–1893); ∞ (2) Charlotte Ross Jeffrey Pierson (1841–1904)
          - William Pierson Hamilton (1869–1950) ∞ (1) Theodosia Sisson (1884–1941); (2) Juliet Pierpont Morgan (1870–1952) [daughter of John Pierpont Morgan]
            - Helen Morgan Hamilton (1896–1985) ∞ (1) Arthur Hale Woods (1870–1942); ∞ (2) Warren Randolph Burgess (1889–1978)
              - John Pierpont Woods (1918–2012)
              - Leonard Hamilton Woods
              - Alexandra Hamilton Woods
              - Caroline Frances Woods
                - Tracy Hollingsworth
                  - Zachary Hollingsworth Jones
                  - Ashley New Jones
                    - Alexandra Ann Bal
                    - Charlotte Tracy Bal
                    - Josephine Elizabeth Bal
                    - James Valentine Bal
                    - Catherine Winifred Bal
                  - Schuyler Hamilton Jones
                  - Owen Morgan Jones
            - Pierpont Morgan Hamilton (1898–1982) ∞ Marie Louise Blair (1899–1994) [daughter of C. Ledyard Blair]; ∞ (2) Rebecca Sticky; ∞ (3) Norah Goldsmith Soutter
              - Philip Schuyler Hamilton (1920–2006)
              - David Hamilton (1922–)
              - Ian Morgan Hamilton (1923–2010)
            - Laurens Morgan Hamilton (1900–1978) ∞ Gertrude Malisch (b. 1887)
            - Alexander Morgan Hamilton (1903–1970) ∞ (1) Katherine Comly (d. 1975); ∞ (2) Elizabeth Malcolm Peltz Warburton Wanamaker (1905–1988)
            - Elizabeth Schuyler Hamilton (1908–1919)
            - Andre Spencer Morgan Hamilton(Born 2004)
            - Miles Spencer Morgan Hamilton(Born 2009)
          - Helen Maria Hamilton (1870–1956) ∞ Philip Mercer Rhinelander (1869–1939)
            - Frederic William Rhinelander (b. 1906)
            - Philip Hamilton Rhinelander (1908–1987)
            - Laurens Hamilton Rhinelander (b. 1909)
          - Laurens Hamilton (1872–1897)
          - Marie Van Den Heuvel Hamilton (1874–1942) ∞ Charles Fearing Swan (1859–1926)
        - Laurens Hamilton (1834–1858)
        - Alice Hamilton (1838–1905)
      - William Stephen Hamilton (1797–1850)
      - Eliza Hamilton (1799–1859) ∞ Sidney Augustus Holly (1802–1842)
      - Philip Hamilton (1802–1884) ∞ Rebecca McLane (1813–1893)
        - Louis McLane Hamilton (1844–1868)
        - Allan McLane Hamilton (1848–1919) ∞ (1) Florence Rutger Craig (1854–1925) ∞ (2) May Copeland Tomlinson (1870–1924)
          - Louis McLane Hamilton (1876–1911)
  - Walter Hamilton (1856–1879)
  - George Hamilton
  - William Hamilton (1788–1856) ∞ Jean Donald [daughter of Robert Donald]
  - Joseph Hamilton (1899–1965)
  - Elizabeth Hamilton ∞ Alexander Blair [son of William Blair]

== Y−DNA ==
Alexander Hamilton belonged to the Y-DNA Haplogroup I1a.
