= Louisa Barnewall Van Rensselaer =

American socialite

- Born: Louisa Barnewall; October 12, 1836; New York City, New York, U.S.
- Died: July 3, 1920 (aged 83); Woodmere, New York, U.S.
- Spouse: Alexander Van Rensselaer (m. 1864; died 1878)
- Children: Louisa Van Renssealer; Mabel Van Rensselaer; Alice Van Rensselaer
- Parent(s): William Barnewall; Clementina Rutgers
- Relatives: See Van Rensselaer family

Louisa Barnewall Van Rensselaer (October 12, 1836 – July 3, 1920), was a prominent member of New York Society during the Gilded Age.

== Early life ==
Louisa was born on October 12, 1836, in New York City. She was the daughter of William Barnewall (1792–1874), an attorney, and Clementina (née Rutgers) Barnewall (1800–1838), who married in 1818. After her mother's death when Louisa was only 2 years old, her father remarried to Anne Coles (1808–1885). Among her siblings was Elizabeth Barnewall (1825–1867), who married Alfred Schermerhorn; Morris Barnewall (1834–1895), who married Eliza Antoinette Hall. (Note: Louisa's niece, Elizabeth Barnewall (1867–1940) (her brother Morris Barnewall's daughter) was married to Alfred M. Coats (1869–1942), the second son of Sir James Coats, 1st Baronet and Lady Sarah Auchincloss (the aunt of Hugh Auchincloss). Alfred's brother was Sir Stuart Coats, 2nd Baronet and his sister was Alice Dudley Coats who married Theodore Frelinghuysen.)

Her maternal grandparents were Nicholas Gouverneur Rutgers, an attorney, (Note: Nicholas Gouverneur Rutgers (1771–1857) was the son of Gertrude Gouverneur and Anthony Rutgers, a brother of Rutgers University namesake Henry Rutgers. After his father's death, his mother married Dr. William Burnet (1730–1791). Nicholas' grandparents were Nicholas Gouverneur and Maria Winkler.) and Cornelia (née Livingston) Rutgers. (Note: Cornelia Livingston Rutgers (1776–1825) was the daughter of John Livingston (1750–1822) and Maria Ann Leroy (1759–1797). Her grandfather, Robert Livingston was the 3rd and final Lord of Livingston Manor.)

== Society life ==
In 1892, Louisa (who at that point was a widow following her husband's death in 1878) along with her two unmarried daughters Mabel and Alice, and her married daughter Louisa and her husband Edmund, were all included in Ward McAllister's "Four Hundred", purported to be an index of New York's best families, published in The New York Times. Conveniently, 400 was the number of people that could fit into Mrs. Astor's ballroom.

== Personal life ==
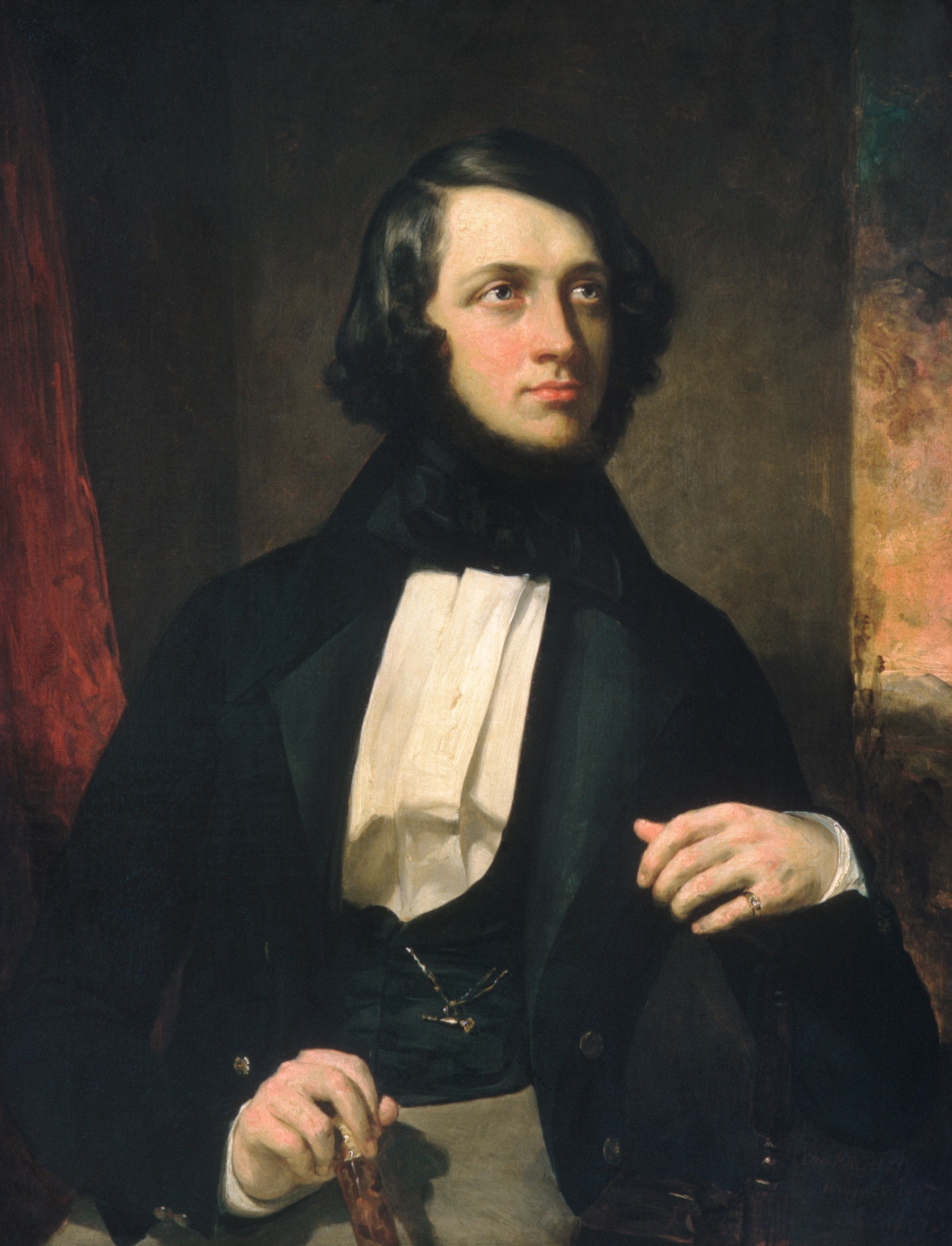
Portrait of her husband Alexander by George P. A. Healy, 1837

On June 30, 1864, Louisa married Alexander Van Renssalaer (1814–1878). Alexander was the youngest surviving son born to Stephen Van Rensselaer, the patroon of the Manor of Rensselaerswyck and Cornelia (née Paterson) Van Renssalaer, the daughter of William Paterson, the 2nd Governor of New Jersey, and later, an Associate Justice of the Supreme Court of the United States. Alexander was the widower of Mary Howland (d. 1855), daughter of Samuel Shaw Howland, whom he married in 1851. She lived at 12 East 37th Street in Manhattan and at "Gortmore" in Southampton, New York. Together, Alexander and Louisa were the parents of three children:

- Louisa Van Renssealer (1865–1945), who married lawyer Edmund Lincoln Baylies, Jr. (1857–1932) in 1887. In 1917, she received the Legion of Honour in recognition of her work for France during the Great War.
- Mabel Van Rensselaer (1868–1959), who married the Rev. James Le Baron Johnson (b. 1870), assistant rector of Grace Church and chaplain of the New York Fire Department, in 1899. Johnson was the son of Rev. Dr. George D. Johnson, the Archdeacon of Christ Church New Brighton.
- Alice Van Rensselaer (1872–1963), a member of the Colonial Dames of America and the Colony Club who did not marry.

Her husband died on May 8, 1878. She died at Woodmere on Long Island on July 3, 1920, and was buried at Green-Wood Cemetery in Brooklyn, New York.
