= 225 Park Avenue South =

Office building in Manhattan, New York

Coordinates: 40°44′15″N 73°59′18″W

225 (right) and 233 (left), as seen from the west side of Park Avenue South at 18th Street

225 Park Avenue South (originally named the American Woolen Building for its tenant, American Woolen Company) is an office building complex in the Flatiron District of Manhattan, New York City. Located at the northeast corner of Park Avenue South and East 18th Street, it is two blocks north of Union Square. The property includes the 19-story 225 Park Avenue South, as well as the 12-story 233 Park Avenue South.

Orda Management owns the facility, which served as a temporary headquarters for the Port Authority of New York and New Jersey (PANYNJ) from 2001 to 2015 after its previous headquarters in the former World Trade Center complex were destroyed in the September 11, 2001 attacks. The complex also formerly had the headquarters of Crown Publishing Group.

== Design ==
The 19-story-tall 225 Park Avenue South was designed by Robert Henderson Robertson, of R.H. Robinson & Sons. The consulting engineer was C. T. Main. 225 has a total of 537,500 square feet (49,940 m^{2}) of space. Built on a steel frame and with a limestone exterior, 225 has a ram's head at its main entrance, on Park Avenue. A freight entrance is on 19th Street.

225 had five elevators for general use for floors 1–13. There were six elevators intended for company and client use only, with two serving the basement through floor 18, one going to floor 19, and three going only to floor 14. The freight elevators in the rear, also only for company/client use, numbered four, with three of them also intended for human passengers. The 14th floor was used as the American Woolen Company's reception area.

233 Park Avenue South, to the north of 225, was constructed around the same time and is 12 stories tall. 233 has a brass ring at its main entrance.

== History ==
Previously, the site was occupied by the 1878 Florence Apartment House.

225 Park Avenue South was built in 1909 as the American Woolen Building. Its address was initially 225 Fourth Avenue. The old address number was kept when the section of Fourth Avenue between 17th and 32nd Streets was renamed Park Avenue South in 1959. Historically. the American Woolen Company occupied floors 13–19.

In the 1980s, The Guardian Life Insurance Company of America signed a lease for 44,000 square feet (4,100 m^{2}). at 225/233 Park Avenue South, having outgrown previous space at their nearby headquarters, the Germania Life Insurance Company Building and its annex. In 1998, Guardian Life moved its headquarters to the Financial District of Manhattan.

Crown Publishing Group had its headquarters at 225 Park Avenue South, occupying 80,000 square feet (7,400 m^{2}) of space. Random House received the space when it acquired the company. In 1990, Random House signaled intentions to sublease the space.

In 2001, the Port Authority of New York and New Jersey moved its headquarters to the 225 Park Avenue South complex after its previous headquarters, at 1 World Trade Center in the former World Trade Center complex, were destroyed in the September 11, 2001 attacks. PANYNJ, which said it intended to use the facility only as a temporary headquarters, leased a total of 315,000 square feet (29,300 m^{2}) in 225 Park Avenue South and 233 Park Avenue South. The Office of Medical Services was at 233 Park Avenue South. In 2014 and 2015, PANYNJ moved to 4 World Trade Center. The medical offices remained at 233 Park Avenue South, but in 2016 the board PANYNJ was scheduled to vote on a new location for those offices. Terence Cullen of Commercial Observer wrote that Facebook "likely" took former PANYNJ space.

In 2014, Buzzfeed signed a lease for 194,000 square feet (18,000 m^{2}) of space on floors 11 through 16.

In 2016, Facebook signed a lease for 200,000 square feet (19,000 m^{2}) of space in the building, with 78,666 square feet (7,308.3 m^{2}) on floors 17–19. and other space between Floor 6 and Floor 10.

A major renovation was executed after the Port Authority of New York and New Jersey departed; it was completed in 2017.

As of 2017, 97.9% of its space was leased. Its 10 tenants included BuzzFeed, Facebook, and STV Inc., which occupied the largest spaces in the building. Following the departure of several major tenants such as Meta Platforms, the mortgage loans on 225 and 233 Park Avenue South were sent to a special servicer in April 2024. At the time, the building was only 40% occupied. By December 2024, the two buildings were valued at $217 million, less than one-third of their 2017 valuation of $750 million.
