= Walter Howe =

American politician (1907–1966)

United States Ambassador to Chile
- In office 1958–1961
- President: Dwight D. Eisenhower
- Preceded by: Cecil B. Lyon
- Succeeded by: Robert F. Woodward

Speaker of the Connecticut House of Representatives
- In office 1939–1940
- Preceded by: J. Mortimer Bell
- Succeeded by: Hugh Meade Alcorn Jr.

Member of the Connecticut House of Representatives from Litchfield
- In office 1935–1943 Serving with Harry B. Morse (1935–1941); Isabel C. Rylander (1941–1943)
- Preceded by: Harry B. Morse; John L. Buel
- Succeeded by: Isabel C. Rylander; Howard Bissell

Personal details
- Born: June 10, 1907 Washington, D.C., U.S.
- Died: April 8, 1966 (aged 58) Barboursville, Virginia, U.S.
- Party: Republican
- Spouse: Mary Jane Wild (m. 1936)
- Relations: Walter Howe (grandfather)
- Children: 4
- Education: Yale University; Harvard University

Military service
- Allegiance: United States
- Branch/service: U.S. Navy
- Rank: Commander
- Battles/wars: World War II; Korean War

Walter Howe (June 10, 1907 – April 8, 1966) was an American politician and diplomat who served as United States Ambassador to Chile from 1958 to 1961.

== Early life ==
Howe was born in Washington, D.C., the son of Anne (née Wilson) Howe (1880–1963) and Ernest Howe (1875–1932), a former state assemblyman and senator from Litchfield. At the time of his death, he was editor of the American Journal of Science, and president of the First National Bank of Litchfield (the oldest nationally chartered bank in the state of Connecticut). His mother was the first Republican state central committeewoman from the 30th Senatorial District after passage of the Women's Suffrage Amendment. His sister, Margaret Bruce Howe, was the founder of the Prospect Press in Hartford and was the wife of Herbert L. Crapo, editor of the Litchfield Enquirer.

His maternal grandparents were Annie (née Hutton) Wilson and Nathaniel Wilson, a prominent Washington attorney. His paternal grandparents were Mary Anne Bruce (née Robins) and Walter Howe, an attorney and member of the New York State Legislature. His paternal uncle was Walter Bruce Howe, the husband of noted composer and pianist Mary Howe.

A graduate of St. George's School in Middletown, Rhode Island, he attended Yale University, where he graduated in 1929, and later did graduate work in history at Harvard University.

== Career ==
Howe was a Republican member of the Connecticut House of Representatives from 1935 to 1943, representing Litchfield. He also served as Speaker of the House of Representatives from 1939 to 1940 and director of the United States Foreign Operations Mission to Columbia. He served in the Navy during World War II and the Korean War, retiring with the rank of Commander.

In 1954, Howe was assigned to be chief of the United States Technical assistance program in Columbia, serving in that role until 1956. While serving as a consultant of the International Cooperation Administration (the predecessor of the present-day U.S. Agency for International Development), President Eisenhower appointed Howe Ambassador Extraordinary and Plenipotentiary to Chile on April 22, 1958. He presented his credentials on June 1, 1958, and served until his mission was terminated and he left his post on March 15, 1961, after John F. Kennedy became president. Howe was a strong critic of Fidel Castro and his regime. On behalf of President Eisenhower, he wrote a letter "defending our policies and sharply attacking Fidel Castro and other Cuban leaders for 'betrayal' of the ideals they proclaimed when they took power on Jan. 1, 1959." The letter provoked an angry rebuttal by Cuban President Torrado and, nine months later, diplomatic tie were severed.

After leaving his post in Chile, he was an adviser on South American affairs.

== Personal life ==
In November 1936, Howe was married to Smith College graduate Mary Jane Wild (1913–2006), a daughter of Mary (née Chamey) Wild and Alfred Wild, who was an investor in Colorado mines for many years. Together, they were the parents of four sons, Jonathan Howe, Peter Massie Howe, Walter Robin Howe, and Timothy Brigham Howe.

He died at the University of Virginia Hospital in Barboursville, Virginia, aged 58, after suffering a heart attack. After a funeral service at St. Michael's Episcopal Church in Litchfield, he was buried at East Cemetery there.

Diplomatic posts
Preceded by Cecil B. Lyon	United States Ambassador to Chile; 1958–1961	Succeeded by Robert F. Woodward
