= Cecil B. Lyon =

American diplomat

Cecil Burton Lyon

8th United States Ambassador to Sri Lanka and the Maldives
- In office Oct 30, 1964 – June 17, 1967
- President: Lyndon B. Johnson
- Preceded by: Frances E. Willis
- Succeeded by: Andrew V. Corry

34th United States Ambassador to Chile
- In office June 15, 1956 – February 25, 1958
- President: Dwight D. Eisenhower
- Preceded by: Willard L. Beaulac
- Succeeded by: Walter Howe

Personal details
- Born: November 8, 1903 Staten Island
- Died: April 6, 1993 (aged 89) Hancock, New Hampshire
- Education: Harvard University
- Occupation: diplomat

Cecil Burton Lyon (November 8, 1903 – April 6, 1993) was an American diplomat and career foreign service officer.

Lyon was born in Staten Island, New York, and he graduated from Harvard University in 1927. He worked as an investment banker prior to entering the Foreign Service in 1931. On an early assignment, as third secretary in Tokyo, he met Elizabeth Sturgis Grew, daughter of Ambassador Joseph C. Grew. They married in 1933 and had two daughters, Alice and Lilla. Alice Lyon played the lead female role of Elaine in the 1964 B-horror film The Horror of Party Beach.

From 1956 to 1958, he served as United States Ambassador to Chile. He served as United States Ambassador to Sri Lanka (then Ceylon) from 1964 to 1967, during which time he concurrently served as United States Ambassador to the Maldives from 1965 to 1967.

He died in his home in Hancock, New Hampshire, on April 6, 1993, aged 89, due to pneumonia.

Diplomatic posts
Preceded by Willard L. Beaulac	United States Ambassador to Chile; 1956–1958	Succeeded by Walter Howe
Preceded by Frances E. Willis	United States Ambassador to Sri Lanka; 1964–1967	Succeeded by Andrew V. Corry
