= Alexandra Hamilton =

Alexandra Hamilton may refer to:

- Alex Coomber (née Alexandra Hamilton, born 1973), British skeleton racer
- Alexandra Hamilton, Duchess of Abercorn (1946–2018), British peeress and philanthropist

== See also ==
- Alexander Hamilton (disambiguation)
