= Robert G. Miner =

American diplomat (1911–1990)

Robert Graham Miner
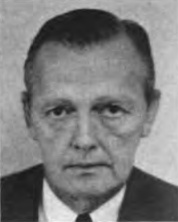

United States Ambassador to Sierra Leone
- In office November 7, 1967 – June 16, 1971
- President: Lyndon B. Johnson
- Preceded by: Andrew V. Corry
- Succeeded by: Clinton Louis Olson

United States Ambassador to Trinidad and Tobago
- In office October 23, 1962 – September 18, 1967
- President: John F. Kennedy
- Preceded by: William H. Christensen (interim)
- Succeeded by: William A. Costello

Personal details
- Born: January 16, 1911 Scranton, Pennsylvania
- Died: February 18, 1990 (aged 79) Fort Walton Beach, Florida
- Education: Hamilton College; Yale University

Military service
- Allegiance: United States Navy
- Rank: Lieutenant
- Battles/wars: World War II

Robert Graham Miner (January 16, 1911 – February 18, 1990) was an American diplomat.

== Early life ==
Miner was born on January 16, 1911, in Scranton, Pennsylvania and grew up in Binghamton, New York. In 1934, Miner earned a B.A. from Hamilton College. In 1942, Miner earned an M.A. from Yale University.

== Career ==
Miner served as an instructor at Athens College from 1934 to 1935. From 1935 to 1937, he served as an instructor at Robert College. From 1937 to 1940, he served as an instructor at Hamilton College. From 1942 to 1943, during World War II, Miner served in the Office of Strategic Services. After this, Miner served in the United States Navy, where he attained the rank of lieutenant.

Miner first got involved in the United States Department of State in 1948, when he joined the United States Foreign Service. Miner was first assigned to Athens, Greece. He served in that post until 1951. In 1951, Miner was detailed to the Imperial Defence College at London, and served there until 1952. In 1952, Miner was assigned to the position of First Secretary to Paris, France, and remained in this position until 1955. In 1956, Miner became Consul General at Istanbul. Miner was appointed by President John F. Kennedy to the position of United States Ambassador to Trinidad and Tobago on October 23, 1962. The presentation of his credentials occurred on December 1, 1962. He remained in this position until September 18, 1967. Miner was appointed by President Lyndon B. Johnson to the position of United States Ambassador to Sierra Leone on November 7, 1967. The presentation of his credentials occurred on December 7, 1967, and again on June 7, 1971, after Sierra Leone became a republic. He remained in this position until June 16, 1971. In 1971, Miner retired.

== Personal life ==
Miner married Antoinette Tubini. Together, they had three children. Later, Miner married Sarah Bland.

== Death ==
Miner died on February 18, 1990, in Fort Walton Beach, Florida.
