= James M. Varnum (born 1848) =

American politician (1848–1907)

James Varnum

Member of the New York State Assembly
- In office 1879–1880
- Preceded by: William Waldorf Astor
- Succeeded by: Robert Ray Hamilton

Personal details
- Born: James Mitchell Varnum; June 29, 1848 New York City, U.S.
- Died: March 26, 1907 (aged 58) Roosevelt Hospital, New York City, U.S.
- Party: Republican
- Spouse: Mary Witherspoon Dickey (m. 1899)
- Parent(s): Joseph B. Varnum Jr. Susan M. Graham
- Education: Yale University; Columbia Law School

James Mitchell Varnum (June 29, 1848 – March 26, 1907) was an American lawyer and politician from New York.

== Early life ==
Varnum was born on June 29, 1848, in New York City, the son of New York State Assembly Speaker Joseph B. Varnum and Susan M. Graham. His great-grandfather was Major General Joseph B. Varnum.

Varnum graduated from Yale University in 1868. He then attended Columbia Law School, graduating from there in 1871 and was admitted to the bar shortly afterwards.

== Career ==
In 1873, he became a member of the law firm Varnum, Turney & Harrison, which his father was the senior partner of. The law firm later became Varnum & Harrison. He was also a director of the Lawyers' Title Insurance Co. and the Fulton Trust Co., trustee of the Real Estate Loan and Trust Co., and one of the original members of the New York Real Estate Exchange.

In 1879, Varnum was elected to the New York State Assembly as a Republican, representing the New York County 11th District. He served in the Assembly in 1879 and 1880. He was then put on the Military Staff of Governor Cornell as senior Aide-de-Camp with the rank of Colonel in the New York National Guard, serving in that position from 1880 to 1882. In 1881, he was a New York commissioner to receive French and German guests for the Yorktown centennial. In 1883, he was chairman of the Committee of Arrangement for the Evacuation Day centennial. In 1889, he was a committee member that supervised the centennial celebration of Washington's inauguration. He served as the grand marshal of the New York City lawyers in the 1896 Sound Money Parade.

In the 1889 New York state election, Varnum was the Republican candidate for Attorney General of New York. In 1890, he was the Republican and anti-Tammany candidate for Judge of the Superior Court. He served as the chairman of the 1891 Republican State Convention. In 1895, Governor Morton appointed him Paymaster-General of the state, with the rank of Brigadier-General. In 1899, then-governor Theodore Roosevelt appointed him Surrogate of New York County.

== Personal life ==
Varnum married Mary Witherspoon Dickey in 1899. They had no children. He was a governor of the University Club and a member of the Bar Association, the Century Club, the Union Club, the Metropolitan Club, the Society of the Cincinnati, the Sons of the Revolution, the General Society of the War of 1812, and the General Society of Colonial Wars. In 1903, the French government appointed him as a Chevalier of the Legion of Honour.

Varnum died in Roosevelt Hospital after suffering a fatal car crash on March 26, 1907. He was buried in Woodlawn Cemetery.

New York State Assembly
Preceded by William Waldorf Astor	New York State Assembly; New York County, 11th District; 1879-1880	Succeeded by Robert Ray Hamilton
