= Florence Apartment House =

Coordinates: 40.7373°N 73.9881°W

The Florence Apartment House (later called the Florence Apartments, the Florence, and Hotel Florence) was an apartment building in New York City on the northeast corner of East 18th Street and Fourth Avenue (later known as East Union Place and today as Park Avenue South).

The seven-story, 42-unit building was built in 1878 by Virginia Leedy Matthews, née Brander, for some $500,000 ($16,291,379 today), mostly financed by a $400,000 balloon loan from The Bank for Savings in the City of New-York. Matthews was the wife of Edward Matthews, "a real estate entrepreneur who at one time controlled more property from Wall Street south than anyone else."

It was designed by a Belgian emigrant, Emile Gruwé, and built by the firm of White and McEvoy. Faced with pressed brick and a Nova Scotia stone façade, the seven-story building occupied 200 feet on East 18th Street and 53 feet on Fourth Avenue. It had interior plumbing and was intended to be the city's first fireproof apartment house. It was designed so it could be operated as a hotel, and did so for a time; the New-York Historical Society holds a photo and documents about Hotel Florence.

Among the building's prominent residents were publisher and editor Francis Pharcellus Church; Elizabeth Shaw Melville, the widow of author Herman Melville; and Jane Byrd Mercer, wife of architect Schuyler Hamilton Jr.

Since 1909, the site has been occupied by 225 Park Avenue South, a 19-story office building.
