= Andrew V. Corry =

American diplomat

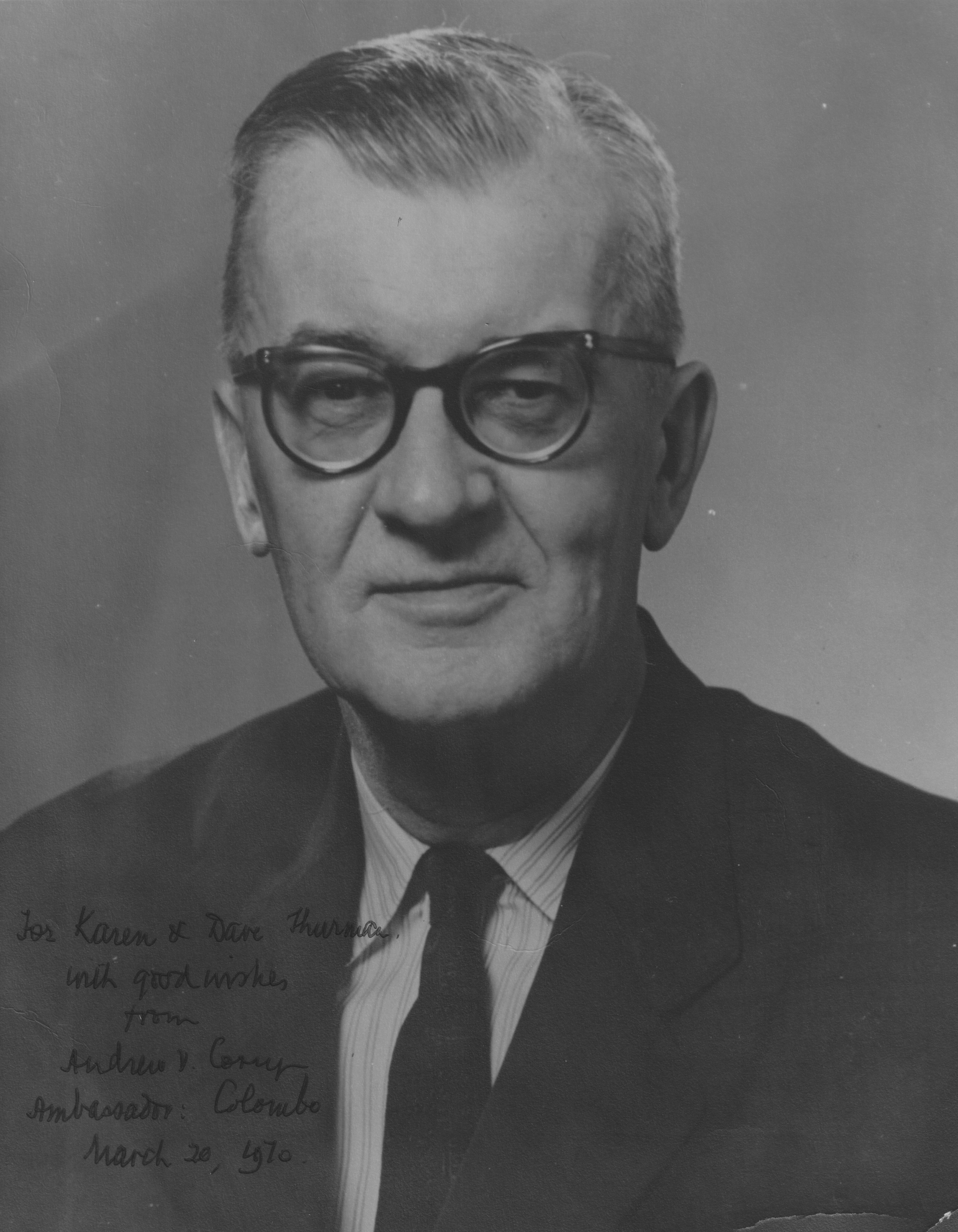
- Corry as U.S. Ambassador to Sri Lanka and the Maldives

9th United States Ambassador to Sri Lanka and the Maldives
- In office May 24, 1967 – March 21, 1970
- President: Lyndon B. Johnson; Richard Nixon
- Preceded by: Cecil B. Lyon
- Succeeded by: Robert Strausz-Hupé

3rd United States Ambassador to Sierra Leone
- In office January 29, 1964 – May 19, 1967
- President: Lyndon B. Johnson
- Preceded by: A. S. J. Carnahan
- Succeeded by: Robert Graham Miner

Personal details
- Born: Andrew Vincent Corry; September 22, 1904 Missoula, Montana, US
- Died: November 24, 1981 (aged 77) San Diego, California, US
- Education: Harvard University
- Occupation: Diplomat

Andrew Vincent Corry (September 22, 1904, Missoula, Montana - November 24, 1981 San Diego, California) was a career foreign service officer who served as the United States ambassador to Sierra Leone from 1964 until 1967. He was then appointed U.S. ambassador to Sri Lanka and the Maldives, serving from 1967 until his retirement in 1970.

== Education ==
Corry was born on September 22, 1904, in Missoula, Montana, the son of Arthur Vincent Corry (Snr) and Mary Anne née Armstrong.

Corry graduated from Carroll High School in Helena, Montana, in 1922. From 1922 to 1924, he studied at Carroll College (also in Helena) before graduating with an A.B. from Harvard. He studied at Merton College, Oxford, from 1927 to 1930 (A.B. 1929, B.Sc. 1930) as a Rhodes Scholar returning to Montana to earn a M.S. in 1931 from the Montana School of Mines in Butte.

== Career ==
Corry joined the Foreign Service in January 1947 as Special Assistant to the Director in the Office of American Republic Affairs. In August that year he was assigned to be Mineral Attaché to New Delhi with concurrent assignments, in the same capacity, to Colombo, Karachi, Rangoon and Kathmandu. From 1955 to 1957 he was the Deputy Director of the US Operations Mission, as well as the Economic Officer at the American Embassy in Madrid. He then worked as the Consul General in Lahore, Pakistan and as the Coordinator of the Senior Seminar in Foreign Policy at the Foreign Service Institute. On January 24, 1964, he was appointed as the US envoy to Sierra Leone and remained at that post until May 19, 1967, where he was subsequently appointed on May 24 as the ambassador to Sri Lanka and the Maldives. He retained that post until he retired on March 21, 1970.

Corry died of emphysema on November 24, 1981, in San Diego, California and was buried at Saint Patricks Cemetery in Butte, Montana.
