= Alexander Hamilton (general) =

American military officer and grandson of Alexander Hamilton

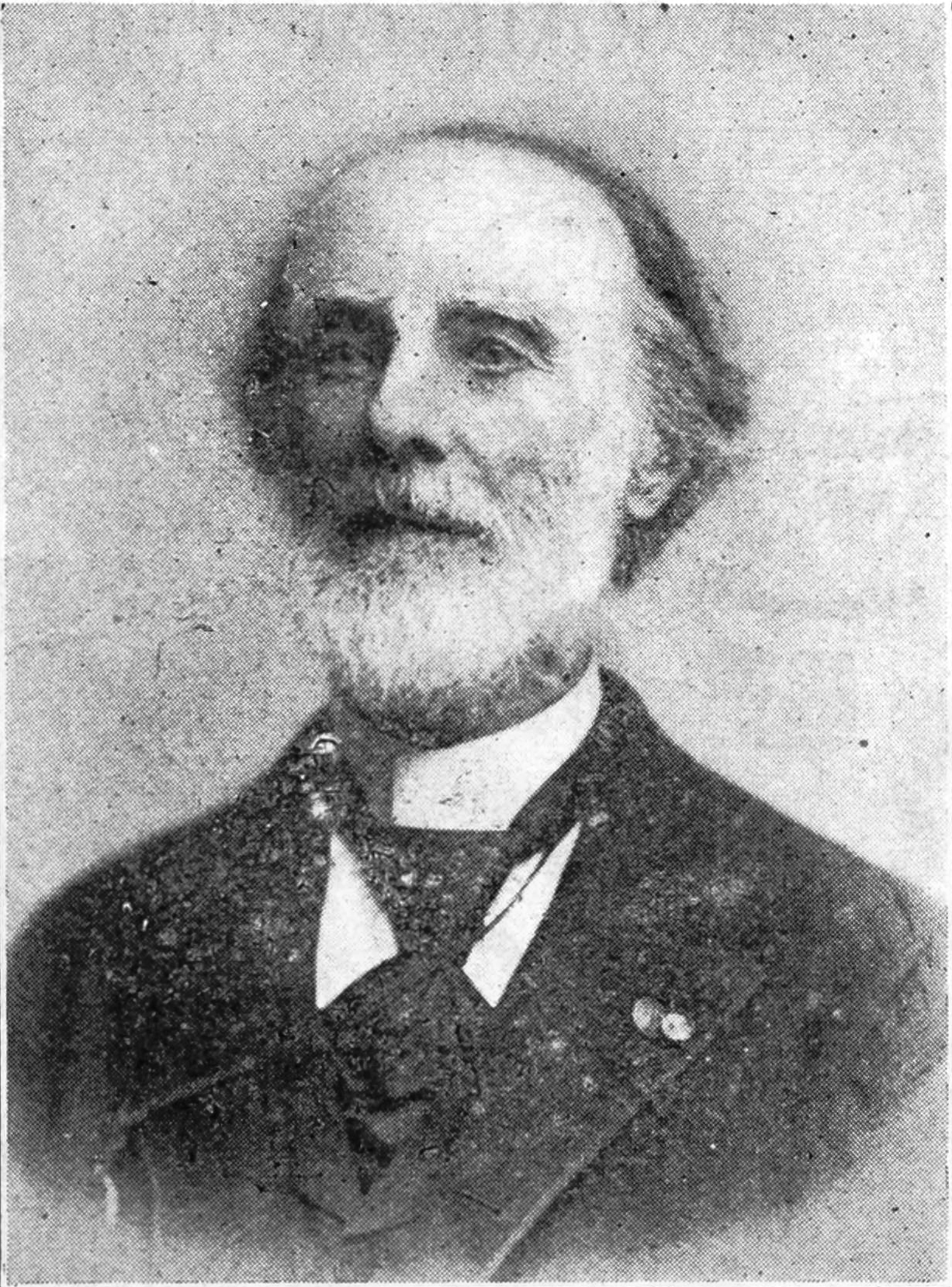
- Major General Alexander Hamilton

Personal details
- Born: Alexander Hamilton; November 15, 1815 New York City
- Died: December 10, 1907 (aged 92) Tarrytown, New York
- Spouses: Elizabeth Smith Nicoll (m. 1842; died 1873); Sarah Elizabeth Bodine (m. 1878; died 1901)
- Children: Alexander; Henry; James; Marie; John
- Parent(s): John Church Hamilton; Maria Eliza van den Heuvel
- Relatives: See Hamilton family
- Education: Columbia College

Military service
- Allegiance: United States
- Branch/service: New York State Militia
- Rank: Major general
- Battles/wars: American Civil War Battle of Chancellorsville

Alexander Hamilton (November 15, 1815 – December 10, 1907) was a major general in the New York State Militia during the American Civil War, and was the oldest grandson of Alexander Hamilton, a founding father and the first Secretary of the Treasury of the United States.

== Early life and education ==
Hamilton was born on November 15, 1815. He was the eldest of 14 children born to John Church Hamilton (1792–1882) and Maria Eliza van den Heuvel Hamilton (1795–1873). Hamilton had 13 younger siblings, Maria Williamson (1817–1822), Charlotte Augusta (1818–1896), John Cornelius Adrian (1820–1879), Schuyler (1822–1903), James (1824–1825), Maria Eliza (1825–1887), Charles Apthorp (1826–1901), Robert P. (1828–1891), Adelaide (1830–1915), Elizabeth (1831–1884), William Gaston (1832–1913), Laurens (1834–1858), and Alice (1838–1905).

His paternal grandparents were Alexander Hamilton, a Founding Father of the United States, and Elizabeth Schuyler. His maternal grandfather was Baron John Cornelius van den Heuvel, the one-time governor of Dutch Guiana.

He graduated from Columbia College, and at a "very early age he had the management of a large amount of real estate for the family and others."

== Career ==
Hamilton joined the 11th Regiment of the New York Artillery, where he became a second lieutenant. When the Civil War broke out, he became the aide-de-camp to Major General Charles W. Sandford, and took part in active campaigns in Virginia.

He was promoted to major general in the New York Militia for his use of a gas balloon constructed by Thaddeus S. C. Lowe for military observation during the war. He later reported directly to President Abraham Lincoln. He was placed in charge of troops during the New York Draft Riots in 1863.

He was the author of a life of Oliver Cromwell, and a book of poetry. His book Dramas and Poems was published in 1887. For his literary work, he added his mother's surname to his own in order to distinguish himself from his similarly named relatives, publishing under the name Alexander Hamilton, of "Heuvel".

== Personal life ==
He was cited as "remarkable for his cultured mind, speaking a number of languages," and as a "mathematician and penman." He was a Republican, and attended an Episcopal church. In 1890 he was elected a member of the New York Society of the Cincinnati, by virtue of descent from his grandfather Alexander Hamilton.

In 1842, Hamilton married Elizabeth Smith Nicoll (1819–1873), a daughter of Henry Woodhull Nicoll. Elizabeth's sister, Mary Louisa Nicoll, was the wife of Gen. Henry Constantine Wayne. Together, they were the parents of five children, three of whom survived to adulthood:

- Rev. Alexander Schuyler Hamilton (1847–1928), who married Adele Walton Livermore.
- Henry Nicoll Hamilton (1849–1914), who married Mary Amelia Fish.
- James Bowdoin Hamilton (1852–1853), who died in infancy.
- Marie Elizabeth Hamilton (1855–1897), who married Francis Henderson of Virginia.
- John Church Hamilton (1859–1865), who died in childhood.

His second marriage, in 1878, was to Sarah Elizabeth Bodine. In 1893, he was brought to court to prove his sanity, after threatening to kill his second wife.

Hamilton died of influenza on December 10, 1907, at his home in Tarrytown, New York.
