= Alexander Hamilton (artist) =

Artist

Alexander Hamilton (Scottish, born 1950) is an artist, publisher and series editor for Studies in Photography books (Art and Visual Culture), distributed by Edinburgh University Press. He is the chair of the Scottish Society for the History of Photography. As an artist, his chosen medium is cyanotype. He has exhibited widely within the UK, Europe and the US, and his work is held at the National Science and Media Museum. A monograph of his life and work, In Search of the Blue Flower: Alexander Hamilton and the Art of Cyanotype, will be published in 2022.

== Life ==
Alexander Hamilton grew up in the Midlands, England and moved to Caithness, Scotland in 1962. He began studying Drawing and Painting at Edinburgh College of Art (ECA) in 1968, and in 1970, as a gallery assistant during Strategy Get Arts, he came under the influence of the participating artists. Following graduation from ECA in 1972, he spent six months recording plants on the uninhabited island of Stroma in Caithness. This began his 50-year journey of creating unique plant-based cyanotypes.

== Work ==
Alexander Hamilton’s artworks offer a visual response to environmental and ecological concerns. The focus of his work is plant life and his relationship to it. He has explored environmental issues ranging from airborne pollution to plant pathology and phenology.

Throughout his career, he has pursued a program of exhibitions, public art projects and residencies, including large-scale sculptures and multi-screen installations, all developing on and perfecting his cyanotype practice.

== Selected exhibitions ==
- 2016 - Votaries of the Blue Flower – University of Edinburgh – Jane McKie and Alexander Hamilton
- 2016 - Blueprints - Gallery Ten
- 2015 - Dignified Spaces – New South Glasgow Hospital
- 2013 - Blueprint: Photography and Engineering - Glasgow Print Studio and Street Level Photoworks
- 2013 - Between the Sun and the Moon - Leyden Gallery
- 2011 - Stromata: Touring exhibition – Highland Council
- 2010 - On the Edge of the World - British Council – Edinburgh
- 2009 - Trace – Galeria Muzalewska
- 2009 - Sensorium: Pictures from Nature's Laboratory - Lancaster University
- 2008 - Blue Flora Celtica – Kinloch Rannoch, Fingal's Cave and Foksal Gallery, Poland
- 2008 - The Glenfinlas Cyanotypes – Edinburgh Art Festival
- 2007 - Evanescence, Vaavatnet, Norway
- 2007 - Contact Rushes - Scottish National Portrait Gallery and Fabryka Sztuki, Lodz
- 2005 - A Landscape Symphony in 22 Movements - Threshold Artspace
- 2002 - The Great Divide - Fruitmarket Gallery, Edinburgh and Hohenheim University, Stuttgart
- 1995 - Four Flowers Cyanotypes- Fotofeis touring exhibition
- 1995 - Shadows in the Water- Fotofeis touring exhibition

== Collections and commissions ==
- National Science and Media Museum
- Foksal Gallery Collection in MoMA Warsaw Collection, Poland
- Seed Chamber, Greenmarket Dundee (2000)
- Glass Panel, Dunbeath Heritage Centre (2001)

== Journal articles ==
- Winter 2017, Interview by Jane Mackie in Studies in Photography
- 2020, "Plants as effective bioindicators of urban air pollution," Leaves
- 2020, "Goethe and Ruskin talking about plants," Leaves
