= Alexander Hamilton (priest) =

Episcopal clergyman (1847–1928)

The Reverend Alexander Hamilton
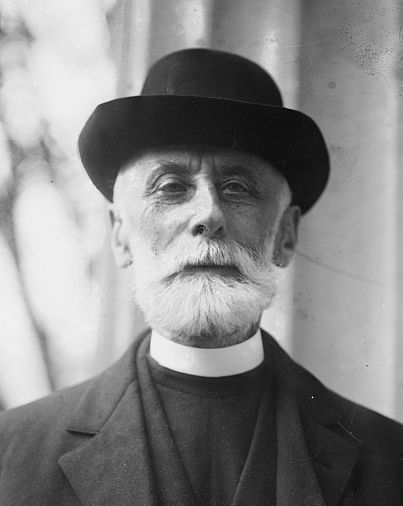
- Hamilton in 1913
- Born: Alexander Schuyler Hamilton; September 9, 1847; Setauket, New York
- Died: June 3, 1928 (aged 80); Westport, Connecticut
- Education: St. Stephen's College; General Theological Seminary
- Occupation: Chaplain
- Spouse: Adele Walton Livermore (m. 1872; died 1907)
- Children: 5
- Parent(s): Alexander Hamilton; Elizabeth Smith Nicoll
- Relatives: See Hamilton family

Alexander Schuyler Hamilton (September 9, 1847 – June 3, 1928) was an American Episcopal priest and great-grandson of Alexander Hamilton, the first Secretary of the Treasury of the United States. He was the rector of Emmanuel Episcopal Church in Weston, Connecticut, by 1893; St. Paul's Episcopal Church in Woodbury, Connecticut, by 1915; and Christ Church in Westport, Connecticut, until he retired in 1920. Hamilton was the chaplain for the Society of the Cincinnati and the Connecticut Society of the Sons of the Revolution. He was also a member of the Advisory Council for the Daughters of the Cincinnati.

== Early life ==
Hamilton was born at Setauket, New York, on Long Island on September 9, 1847, to General Alexander Hamilton (1815–1907) and Elizabeth Smith Nicoll (1819–1873). His siblings were Henry Nicoll Hamilton (1849–1914), James Bowdoin Hamilton (1852–1853), and Marie Elizabeth Hamilton (1855–1897). He and his family moved to the Ramapo Valley in 1858, then to New York City in 1861. He served during the American Civil War under the command of his father, who was then a colonel in the New York Militia.

He attended St. Stephen's College and then attended the General Theological Seminary in Manhattan. He received his ordination in 1870 at the Church of the Transfiguration as a deacon.

== Career ==
He was ordained as a priest in 1890 by Bishop Henry Codman Potter, seventh Bishop of the Episcopal Diocese of New York. By 1893, he was the rector of the Emmanuel Episcopal Church in Weston, Connecticut. That same year his father was judged to be insane.

In 1894, he resigned from Emmanuel Episcopal Church. As reported by The New York Times, after a previous disagreement, John Watson Gulick attempted to visit Hamilton's daughter, Anne, whom he had dated before. He was met with coldness from the Hamilton family and a short time later Hamilton's daughter was engaged to another man by the name of Gilbert Kellogg. Soon after the engagement, six of Gullick's relatives who were also members of the church, demanded Hamilton's resignation. In his resignation statement he said: "when there are two members of this church who wish me to resign, my resignation is ready ... I stand before you a condemned man."

After his resignation Hamilton became pastor at Christ Episcopal Church in Trumbull, Connecticut. Following Hamilton's resignation, it was reported that his father, General Alexander Hamilton, had invited him to move to his place of residence.

He retired as rector of Christ Church in Westport, Connecticut, in 1920.

=== Memberships ===
He was chaplain of the Society of the Cincinnati. He was a member and chaplain for the Society of Colonial Wars; chaplain of the Military Order of Foreign Wars; chaplain of the Veteran Corps, War of 1812; general chaplain Society of War of 1812; member of Sons of the Revolution; chaplain Sons of Veterans, Lafayette Camp, No. 140, New York; member of the Union Society of Civil War; member of St. Nicholas Society; member of the Order of Colonial Lords of Manors in America; member of Military Order of Foreign Wars; member of St. John's Lodge, No. 6, Connecticut, Free and Accepted Masons, also member of numerous historical societies.

== Personal life ==
On July 12, 1872, he married Adele Walton Livermore (1849–1907), the daughter of William W. Livermore, a banker, in New York City. She was the grand-niece of William Floyd, a signer of the Declaration of Independence. They had five children.

- Anne Adele Walton Hamilton (1873–1898)
- Alma Elizabeth Hamilton (b. 1877)
- Charlotte Maria Hamilton (1882–1907)
- Esther Livermore Hamilton (1884–1884)
- Alexander Schuyler Hamilton Jr. (1886–1914)

Hamilton died in Westport, Connecticut, on June 3, 1928.

== See also ==
- Hamilton family
