= Robert Ray Hamilton =

American politician (1851–1890)

Member of the New York State Assembly from the 11th district
- In office January 1, 1886 – December 31, 1889
- Preceded by: Walter Howe
- Succeeded by: William N. Hoag
- In office January 1, 1881 – December 31, 1881
- Preceded by: James M. Varnum
- Succeeded by: J. Hampden Robb

Personal details
- Born: March 18, 1851 New York City, New York, U.S.
- Died: August 1890 (aged 39) Snake River, Idaho, U.S.
- Party: Republican
- Spouse: Evangeline L. Mann (née Steele) (m. 1889)
- Parent(s): Schuyler Hamilton; Cornelia Ray
- Relatives: Hamilton family
- Education: Columbia College; Columbia Law School
- Occupation: Politician; lawyer

Robert Ray Hamilton (March 18, 1851 – August 1890) was an American politician from New York.

== Early life ==
Robert Ray Hamilton was born on March 18, 1851, to General Schuyler Hamilton. He was the grandson of John Church Hamilton (1792–1882); and great-grandson of Alexander Hamilton (1755/7–1804) and Elizabeth Schuyler Hamilton.

Hamilton graduated from Columbia College and Columbia Law School. He was admitted to the bar, and practiced law in New York City.

== Career ==
Hamilton was elected as a Republican to the New York State Assembly (New York Co., 11th D.) in 1881, 1886, 1887, 1888 and 1889. In 1879, he was a Republican candidate for alderman in New York City, but lost. He was a delegate to the 1888 Republican National Convention.

In the summer of 1890, Hamilton bought a half interest in a ranch owned by John Sargent in Idaho on the road into Yellowstone Park where he intended to live permanently.

== Personal life ==
In August 1889, it became known that he was married to Evangeline L. Mann (née Steele), a "notorious woman" who had ensnared him by claiming that he was the father of her child Beatrice. Evangeline Mann assaulted her maid, and was sentenced to two years in prison. In October 1889, Hamilton sued for divorce. He stated that the marriage had been performed on January 7, 1889, and told the truth about Beatrice which had been in fact some foundling used for the scheme to get money out of Hamilton (who had an income of about $40,000 a year inherited from his maternal grandfather Robert Ray). It was later proved in court that Eva had been married already to one Joshua L. Mann before she ever knew Hamilton, and Mann sued for divorce in 1893.

Hamilton left New York City to travel west on May 30, 1890. On August 23, 1890, he was found dead in the Snake River, near the Southern end of Yellowstone Park, apparently having drowned and having been in the water for several days, making identification somewhat difficult. An investigation accused John Sargent of murdering Hamilton, but Sargent was found to be legally insane and was never prosecuted for the crime.

== Sources ==
- The New York Red Book compiled by Edgar L. Murlin (published by James B. Lyon, Albany NY, 1897; pg. 501 and 505ff)
- Fourth Annual Record of Assemblymen and Senators from the City of New York in the State Legislature published by the City Reform Club (1889; pg. 46–50)
- "Very Costly Infatuation", The New York Times, August 30, 1889
- "Eva Asked For Morphine" The New York Times, September 6, 1889
- "Wants A Divorce" The New York Times, October 4, 1889
- "He Wants A Divorce" The New York Times, January 14, 1890
- "Death Has Divorced Them" The New York Times, September 15, 1890
- "Eva Begins Her Fight" The New York Times, January 13, 1891
- "Robert Ray Hamilton is Dead" The New York Times, January 29, 1891
- "Mr. Sargent Testifies" The New York Times, June 21, 1891
- "Mann Said to Be Insane" The New York Times, March 28, 1893
- "John I. Sargent Insane" The New York Times, December 28, 1899

New York State Assembly
Preceded by James M. Varnum	New York State Assembly; New York County, 11th District; 1881	Succeeded by J. Hampden Robb
Preceded by Walter Howe	New York State Assembly; New York County, 11th District; 1886–1889	Succeeded by William N. Hoag
