= Alex Hamilton (footballer, born 1937) =

Scottish footballer

Personal information
- Full name: Alexander McGregor Hamilton
- Date of birth: 21 November 1937
- Place of birth: Kirkcolm, Scotland
- Date of death: 3 November 2009 (aged 71)
- Place of death: Blackburn, England
- Height: 5 ft 7 in (1.70 m)
- Position: Wing half

Youth career
- ?–1957: Drumore Juniors

Senior career*
Years	Team	Apps	(Gls)
1957–1962	Accrington Stanley	82	(0)
1962	York City	11	(0)
1962–?	Nelson	?	(?)
	Clayton	?	(?)
	Poplar	?	(?)
Total		93	(0)
- * Club domestic league appearances and goals

Alexander McGregor Hamilton (21 November 1937 – 3 November 2009) was a Scottish footballer who played as a wing half. He played for Accrington Stanley and York City in the English Football League.

== Career ==
Born in Kirkcolm, Wigtownshire, Hamilton played for Drumore Juniors before joining Accrington Stanley in August 1957. After making 82 appearances in the English Football League he joined York City in March 1962. He finished the 1961–62 season with 11 appearances for York and he left the club to sign for Nelson in August. He later played for Clayton of the West Lancashire Football League and Poplar of the Accrington and District Combination. He died at Royal Blackburn Hospital, Blackburn, Lancashire on 3 November 2009 at the age of 71.
