= John Church Hamilton =

American politician and son of Alexander Hamilton (1792–1882)

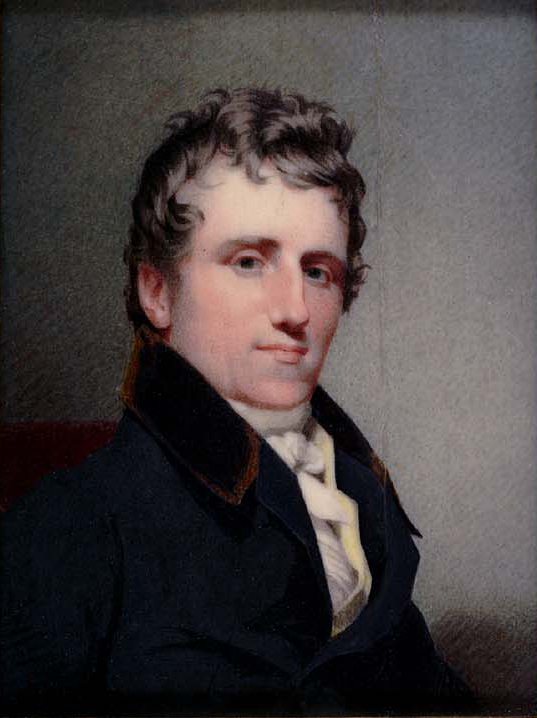
- Hamilton at about age 48, painted c. 1840 by Alfred Thomas Agate
- Born: August 22, 1792; Philadelphia, Pennsylvania, U.S.
- Died: July 25, 1882 (aged 89); Long Branch, New Jersey, U.S.
- Education: Columbia College (1809)
- Occupations: Historian, lawyer
- Spouse: Maria Eliza van den Heuvel (m. 1814; died 1873)
- Children: Alexander; Maria; Charlotte; John; Schuyler; James; Maria; Charles; Robert; Adelaide; Elizabeth; William; Laurens; Alice
- Parent(s): Alexander Hamilton; Elizabeth Schuyler Hamilton
- Relatives: See Hamilton family
- Military career
- Allegiance: United States
- Branch: United States Army
- Service years: 1812–1814
- Rank: Second lieutenant
- Conflicts: War of 1812

John Church Hamilton (August 22, 1792 − July 25, 1882) was an American historian, biographer, and lawyer. He was the son of Alexander Hamilton, one of the Founding Fathers of the United States.

== Early life and education ==
Hamilton was born on August 22, 1792, in Philadelphia, then the capital of the newly-established United States following the victory of American Revolutionary forces in the Revolutionary War, where they emerged victorious against the Kingdom of Great Britain and the British military, then considered the most powerful in the world.

Hamilton was the fourth son, and the fifth of eight children, born to Alexander Hamilton, a Founding Father who was appointed by George Washington as the nation's first U.S. Secretary of the Treasury, and Elizabeth Schuyler Hamilton. His maternal grandparents were Philip Schuyler, a Revolutionary War hero and United States senator from New York state, and Catherine Van Rensselaer. He was named for his uncle John Barker Church.

In 1804, when Hamilton was nearly twelve years old, Vice President Aaron Burr killed his father in a duel. Interviewed decades later by The Philadelphia Times, at the age of 85, he described his recollection of the night before the duel and the duel itself:

I recall a single incident about it with full clearness...The day before the duel I was sitting in a room, when, at a slight noise, I turned around and saw my father in the doorway, standing silently there and looking at me with a most sweet and beautiful expression of countenance. It was full of tenderness, and without any of the business pre-occupation he sometimes had. "John," he said, when I had discovered him, "won't you come and sleep with me to-night?" His voice was frank as if he had been my brother instead of my father. That night I went to his bed, and in the morning very early he awakened me, and taking my hands in his palms, all four hands extended, he said and told me to repeat the Lord's Prayer. Seventy-five years have since passed over my head, and I have forgotten many things, but not that tender expression when he stood looking at me in the door nor the prayer we made together the morning before the duel. I do not so well recollect seeing him lie upon his deathbed, though I was there.

In 1809, he graduated from Columbia College, and subsequently studied law.

== Career ==
=== Army service ===
Hamilton began serving in the U.S. Army during the War of 1812, attaining the rank of second lieutenant. During this time he served as an aide-de-camp to Major General William Henry Harrison, a future president of the United States. In June 1814, without ever being actively engaged in the field, he resigned from his position in the army and returned to private life.

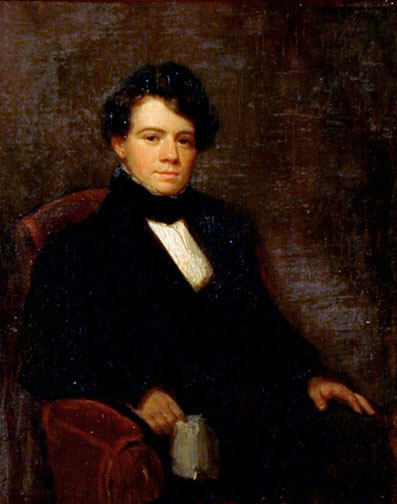
Hamilton, painted between 1825 and 1830 by Henry Inman

=== Historian ===
Upon returning from military service, "he did not apply himself to the practice of law," according to his obituary in The New York Times. Instead, "having strong literary tastes, [Hamilton] devoted himself to the study of history, with a view to writing his father's life."

Between 1834 and 1840, Hamilton read, sorted, and organized his father's letters and other papers, and wrote a two-volume biography titled The Life of Alexander Hamilton. The biography was published in 1840–1841; however, nearly all copies were destroyed in a fire while in the process of binding.

During the next decade, Hamilton edited his father's collected writings under the authority of the Joint Library Committee of the United States Congress. The seven-volume authorized edition, The Works of Alexander Hamilton: Containing His Correspondence, and His Political and Official Writings, Exclusive of the Federalist, Civil and Military, was published by order of Congress in 1850–1851.

Hamilton also wrote a biography in seven volumes, published between 1857 and 1864, titled Life of Alexander Hamilton: A History of the Republic of the United States of America. The work combined a biography of his father with a history of the United States "as traced in his writings and in those of his contemporaries." After several other biographers had abandoned the project, Hamilton had been prompted to write the comprehensive biography by his mother, who died prior to its publication.

In 1869, Hamilton published an edition of The Federalist, with historical notes and commentary.

=== Politics ===
Hamilton was a member of the Whig Party and later a Republican, but never held elected office, having lost a run for Congress to represent part of New York City.

His opinions on economics were at different times solicited by Presidents Ulysses S. Grant and Chester A. Arthur.

== Later life ==
In 1880, he presented a statue of Alexander Hamilton to the city of New York, "though preferring it were the act of others." At the November 22, 1880, unveiling of the statue in Central Park near the Metropolitan Museum of Art, he said that after a century of the nation's existence, time had shown "the utility of [Hamilton's] public services and the lessons of his polity," and that he trusted "that this memorial may aid in their being recalled and usefully appreciated."

On July 25, 1882, the 89-year-old Hamilton died at Stockton Cottage, on Ocean Avenue in Long Branch, New Jersey, due to complications of jaundice and catarrh. His funeral was held at Trinity Church in Manhattan.

== Family ==
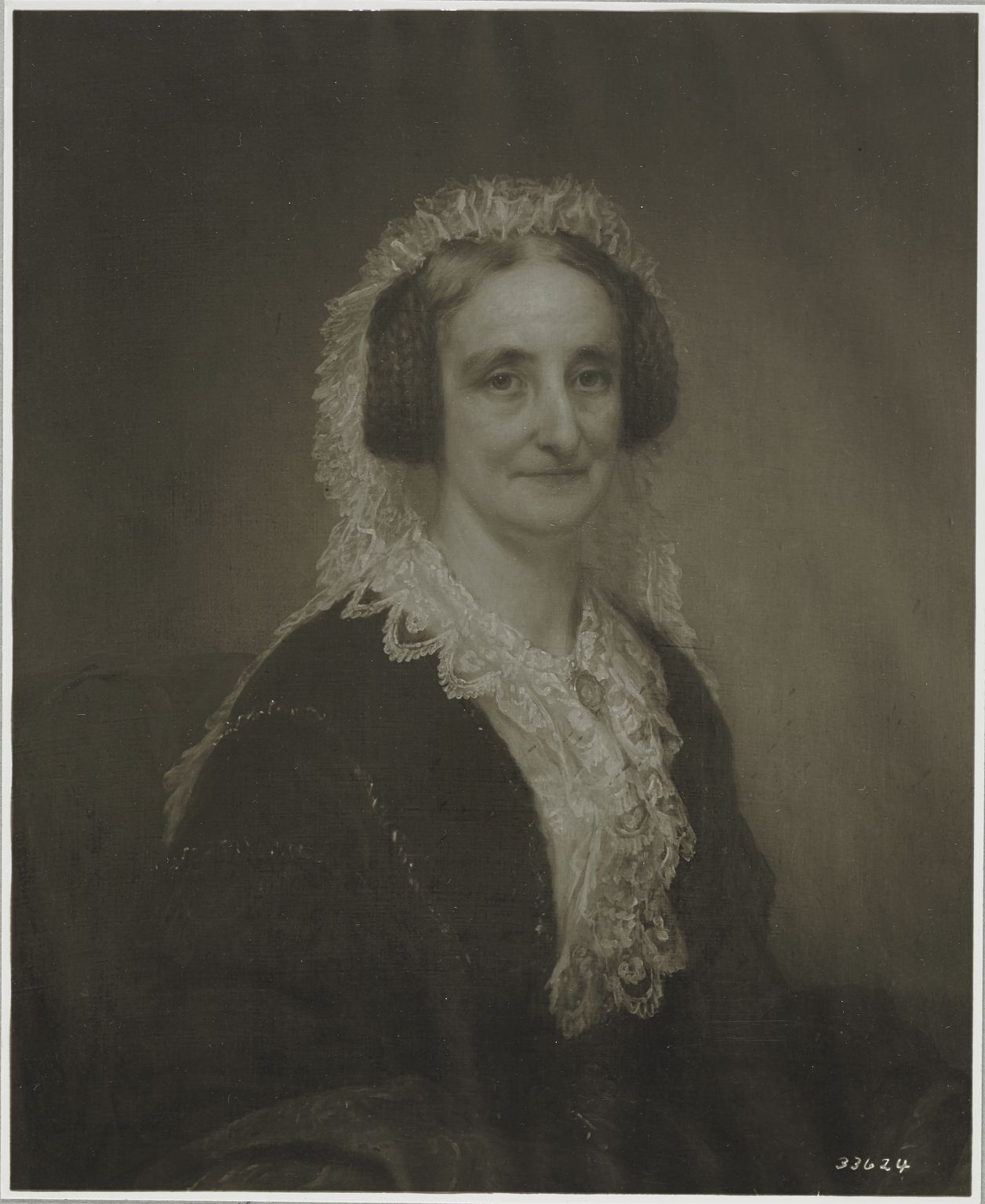
Maria Eliza van den Heuvel (January 4, 1795 – September 13, 1873)

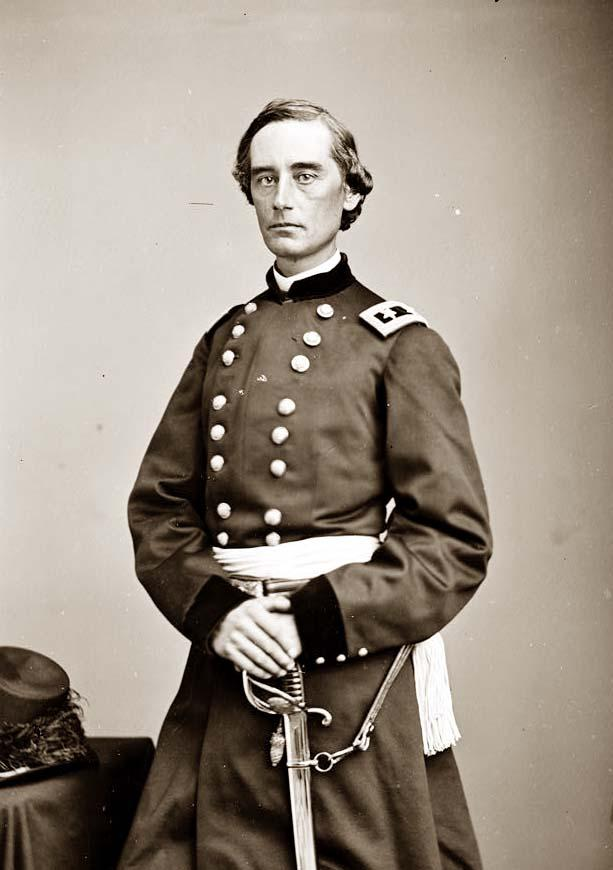
His son, Schuyler Hamilton

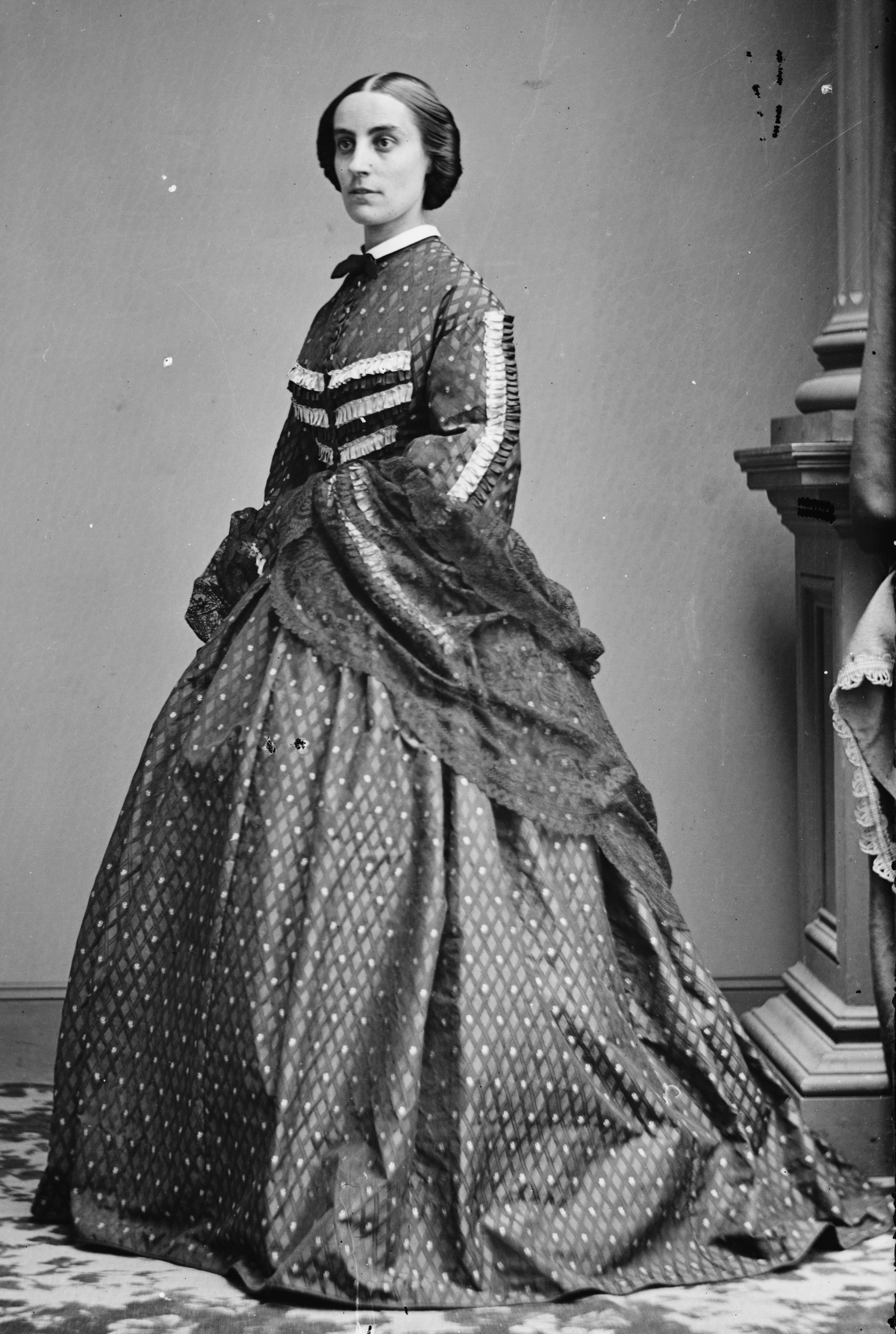
His daughter, Elizabeth Hamilton Halleck Cullum

He was married to Maria Eliza van den Heuvel (January 4, 1795 – September 13, 1873), the daughter of Jan Cornelis Van den Heuvel, a Dutch born plantation owner and politician who served as governor of the Dutch province of Demerara from 1765 to 1770 and later became a merchant in New York City with the Dutch West India Company. Together they had fourteen children:

- General Alexander Hamilton (1815–1907), a major general in the Civil War, author of Dramas and Poems (1887).
- Maria Williamson Hamilton (1817–1822)
- Charlotte Augusta Hamilton (1819–1896)
- John Cornelius Adrian Hamilton (1820–1879)
- Schuyler Hamilton (1822–1903), who served in the Mexican War
- James Hamilton (1824–1825)
- Maria Eliza Hamilton (1825–1887), who married Judge Charles A. Peabody (1814–1901)
- Charles Apthorp Hamilton (July 23, 1826 – November 29, 1901), was educated in New York, England, and Germany. After clerking for a New York law firm, he practiced law in Wisconsin. He enlisted in the Wisconsin Volunteer Infantry at the start of the Civil War in 1861, reaching the rank of lieutenant colonel. A severe battle injury to both legs compelled his resignation in March 1863, and he returned to practicing law. In 1881, he was elected judge of the circuit court for Milwaukee.
- Robert P. Hamilton (1828–1891)
- Adelaide Hamilton (1830–1915)
- Elizabeth Hamilton (1831–1884), who first married Henry Wager Halleck in 1855 and after his death, married George Washington Cullum in 1875.
- William Gaston Hamilton (1832–1913), a consulting engineer of the Pennsylvania Railroad Company
- Laurens Hamilton (1834 – July 6, 1858), named in memory of John Laurens. An 1854 graduate of Columbia College, he served for one year as a private in the Seventh Regiment of New York. He died at the age of 23, drowned accidentally while serving as part of a military escort aboard a ship returning the remains of President James Monroe to Richmond, Virginia.
- Alice Hamilton (September 11, 1838 – September 15, 1905)
