= Schuyler Hamilton =

United States Army general (1822–1903)

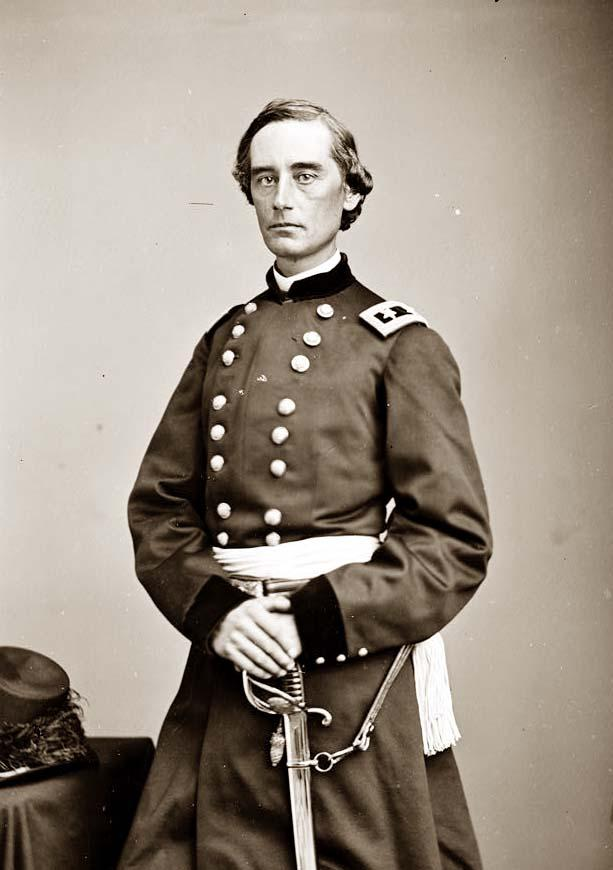
- General Schuyler Hamilton

Personal details
- Born: July 22, 1822 New York City, New York, U.S.
- Died: March 18, 1903 (aged 80) Manhattan, New York, U.S.
- Resting place: Green-Wood Cemetery, Brooklyn
- Spouses: Cornelia Ray (m. 1850; died 1867) Louisa Francis Paine Allen (m. 1886; died 1898)
- Children: Robert Ray Hamilton; Schuyler Hamilton Jr. Charles Althrop Hamilton
- Parent(s): John Church Hamilton; Maria Eliza van den Heuvel
- Relatives: See Hamilton family

Military service
- Allegiance: United States of America
- Branch/service: United States Army; Union Army
- Years of service: 1841–1854; 1861–1863
- Rank: Brigadier General; Major General (unconfirmed)
- Battles/wars: Mexican–American War; Battle of Monterrey; American Civil War; Battle of Island Number Ten; Siege of Corinth

Schuyler Hamilton (July 22, 1822 – March 18, 1903) was an American soldier, farmer, engineer, and a grandson of Alexander Hamilton.

== Early life ==
Hamilton was born on July 22, 1822, in New York City. He was the fifth of 14 children born to John Church Hamilton (1792–1882) and Maria Eliza van den Heuvel. His paternal grandparents were Alexander Hamilton (1755/7–1804), a Founding Father of the United States, and Elizabeth Schuyler (1757–1854). His maternal grandfather was Baron John Cornelius van den Heuvel, the one-time governor of Dutch Guiana. Through his sister, Elizabeth Hamilton (1831–1884), he was the brother-in-law of Gen. Henry Halleck, and after his death, of Gen. George Washington Cullum. Hamilton attended and graduated from West Point in 1841.

== Career ==
=== Mexican War ===
Hamilton served with great gallantry in the Mexican War, and was brevetted first lieutenant in 1846 and captain in 1847. From 1847 until 1854, he was aide-de-camp to Lieutenant General Winfield Scott. In 1852, he wrote A History of our National Flag and on May 31, 1855, he resigned from the Army. During the War, he was wounded twice, once by a ball in the stomach and once by a lance which went completely through his chest, piercing his lung. Hamilton became an original member of the Aztec Club of 1847.

=== California and Connecticut ===
After the Mexican War, he went to California and briefly interned for William Tecumseh Sherman Lucas, Turner & Co. bank before becoming the administrator of the New Almaden quicksilver mine in Santa Clara County. After three years, he returned to the East coast and became a farmer in Branford, Connecticut.

=== Civil War ===
Upon the outbreak of the Civil War, he left his crops and volunteered as a private in the Seventh Regiment, New York National Guard. He worked on the staff of Gen. Benjamin Butler and was rapidly promoted, becoming a lieutenant colonel on the staff of General Scott as military secretary, and renewing his acquaintance with Gen. William T. Sherman

He was promoted to brigadier general of volunteers in November 1861 and served as a staff officer in the Department of the Missouri. At the Battle of Island Number Ten, Hamilton led the 2nd Division in the Army of the Mississippi. He was transferred to command the 3rd Division throughout much of the Siege of Corinth. Toward the close of that campaign Hamilton was elevated to command the Right Wing of the Army of the Mississippi, consisting of the 3rd and 4th Divisions. In September 1862, he was selected for promotion to major general but this promotion was never confirmed.

In 1863 he was compelled to resign, due to a prolonged illness. President Lincoln, with whom he had maintained a correspondence during the war, regretfully accepted the resignation. After the war, he joined the New York Commandery of the Military Order of the Loyal Legion of the United States.

=== Later career ===
He returned to his farm in Connecticut for three years and then moved back to New York City. From 1871 until 1873, he was a hydrographic engineer, in the Department of Docks, New York City. From 1873 until 1875, he was superintendent of yards, and subsequently, owing to ill health, lived in retirement. In 1874, his son, Robert Ray Hamilton, on a trip west, had a jacket commissioned by the Cree Metis people, a Native American tribe, for Hamilton. On June 4, 1877, he delivered an address in front of the New York Historical Society, that was later published into a book, Our National Flag, the Stars and Stripes, Its History in a Century. In 1889, he wrote to The New York Times, calling for a return to civility and grace in allowing foreigners to compliment the United States and its leaders who have departed.

== Personal life ==
On April 3, 1850, Hamilton married Cornelia Ray (1829–1867) in New York City. She was the daughter of Robert Ray (1794–1879), a merchant, and Cornelia Prime (1800–1874).

- Robert Ray Hamilton (1851–1890), a New York State Assemblyman
- Schuyler Hamilton Jr. (1853–1907), a well known architect, who married Gertrude Van Cortlandt Wells (1849–1944), daughter of Alexander Wells and later the Baroness de Graffenried.
- Charles Althrop Hamilton (1858–1875), who died aged 17

On July 11, 1886, several years after his first wife's death, he married Louisa Francis Paine Allen (1832–1898) at the Park Hotel in Manhattan.

On March 18, 1903, he died at his residence, 24 West 59th Street in New York City, after having been invalid for several years.

=== Descendants ===
Hamilton's grandchildren included: Schuyler Van Cortlandt Hamilton, Gertrude Ray Hamilton, and Violet Loring Hamilton.
