= Burr–Hamilton duel =

1804 duel between Aaron Burr and Alexander Hamilton

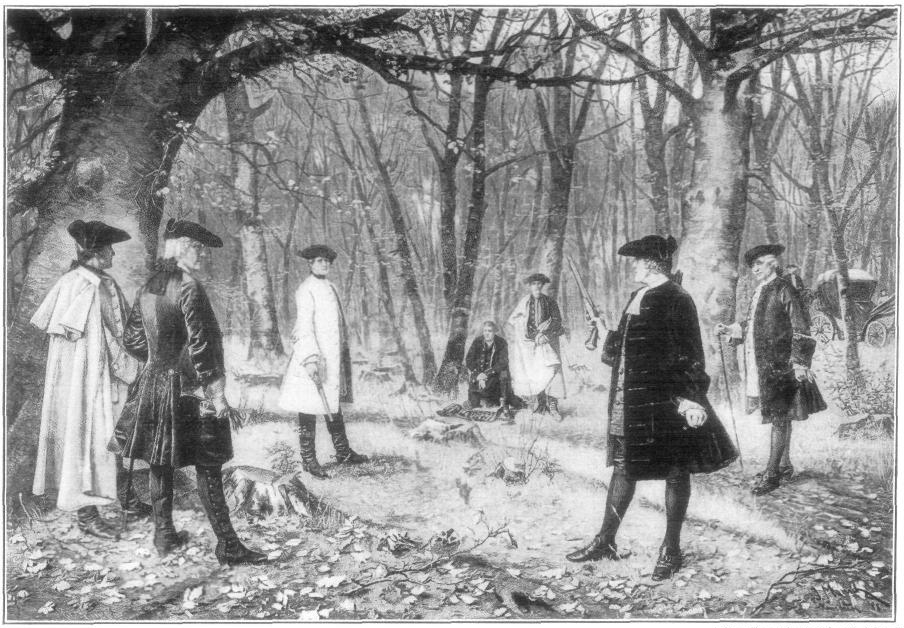
- 1902 illustration of duel
- Date: July 11, 1804; 222 years ago
- Location: Weehawken, New Jersey, U.S.; 40°46′13″N 74°01′01″W
- Type: Homicide, duel
- Participants: Vice President Aaron Burr; Former secretary of the treasury Alexander Hamilton
- Deaths: 1 (Alexander Hamilton)
- Charges: Burr: Murder (dismissed)

The Burr–Hamilton duel took place in Weehawken, New Jersey, between then-U.S. vice president Aaron Burr and Alexander Hamilton, the first and former secretary of the treasury, at dawn on July 11, 1804. The duel was the culmination of a bitter rivalry that had developed over years between both men, who were high-profile politicians in the newly-established United States, founded following the victorious American Revolution and its associated Revolutionary War. It is one of the most famous duels in American history.

In the duel, Burr shot Hamilton in the abdomen. Hamilton's shot hit a tree branch above and behind Burr's head. Hamilton was transported across the Hudson River for treatment in present-day Greenwich Village in New York City, where he died the following day, on July 12.

Hamilton's death permanently weakened the Federalist Party, which he had founded in 1789 and was one of the nation's two major parties at the time. It also ended Burr's political career, as he was vilified for shooting Hamilton. Alexander Hamilton was shot close to the spot where his son Philip Hamilton had been fatally wounded in a duel with George I. Eacker three years prior.

== Background ==
=== Political animosity ===
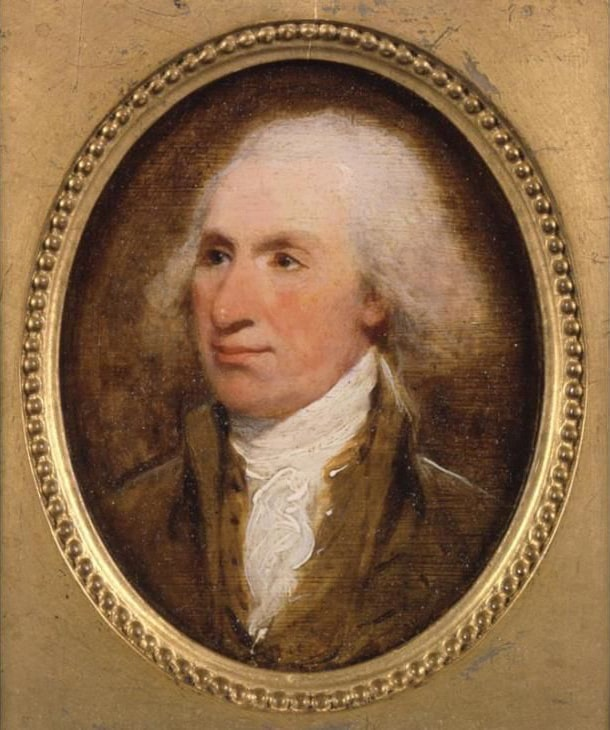
Philip Schuyler, Hamilton's father-in-law, a Continental Army general under Washington and later a U.S. Senator, representing New York state

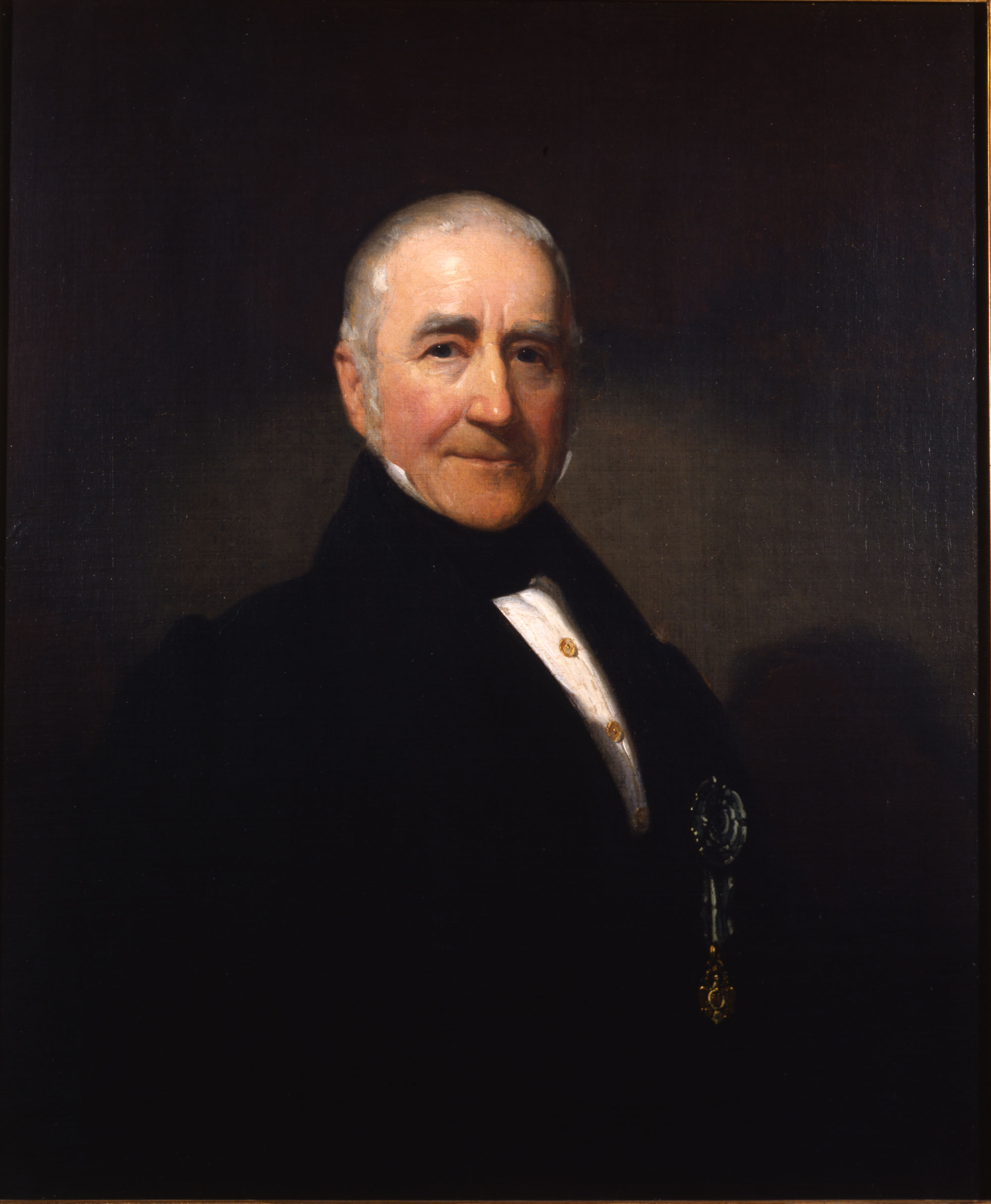
Morgan Lewis, endorsed by Hamilton, defeated Burr in the 1804 New York gubernatorial election, which further inflamed the conflict between Burr and Hamilton

The Burr–Hamilton duel was the final skirmish of a long conflict between Democratic-Republicans and Federalists. The conflict began in 1791 when Aaron Burr won a United States Senate seat from Philip Schuyler, Alexander Hamilton's father-in-law, who would have supported Federalist policies. Hamilton was the U.S. Secretary of the Treasury at the time. The Electoral College then deadlocked in the 1800 presidential election, during which Hamilton's maneuvering in the U.S. House of Representatives played a factor in Thomas Jefferson's winning the presidency over Burr. At the time, the candidate who received the most votes was elected president while the candidate with the second most votes became vice president. There were only proto-political parties at the time, and joint tickets had not yet become a feature of elections as they are currently.

Hamilton's animosity toward Burr was severe and well-documented in personal letters to his friend and compatriot James McHenry. In a January 4, 1801, letter to McHenry, Hamilton wrote:

Nothing has given me so much chagrin as the Intelligence that the Federal party were thinking seriously of supporting Mr. Burr for president. I should consider the execution of the plan as devoting the country and signing their own death warrant. Mr. Burr will probably make stipulations, but he will laugh in his sleeve while he makes them and will break them the first moment it may serve his purpose.

Hamilton details the many charges that he has against Burr in a more extensive letter written shortly afterward, calling Burr a "profligate, a voluptuary in the extreme," accusing him of corruptly serving the interests of the Holland Land Company while a member of the legislature, criticizing his military commission, accusing him of resigning it under false pretenses and other serious accusations.

As it became clear that Jefferson would drop Burr from his ticket in the 1804 presidential election, Burr chose to run for the governorship of New York instead. He was backed by members of the Federalist Party and was under patronage of Tammany Hall in the New York gubernatorial election. Hamilton campaigned vigorously against Burr, causing him to lose the election to Morgan Lewis, a Clintonian Democratic-Republican whom Hamilton had endorsed.

=== Prior duels ===
Both men had been involved in duels in the past. Hamilton had been involved in more than a dozen affairs of honor prior to his fatal encounter with Burr, including disputes with William Gordon (1779), Aedanus Burke (1790), John Francis Mercer (1792–1793), James Nicholson (1795), James Monroe (1797), Ebenezer Purdy and George Clinton (1804). He also served as a second to John Laurens in a 1779 duel with General Charles Lee, and to legal client John Auldjo in a 1787 duel with William Pierce. Hamilton also claimed that he had one previous honor dispute with Burr, while Burr stated that there were two.

Additionally, Hamilton's son Philip was killed in a November 23, 1801, duel with George I. Eacker, which was initiated after Philip and his friend Stephen Price engaged in disruptive behavior in Eacker's box at the Park Theatre in Manhattan. This was in response to a speech that Eacker had made on July 3, 1801, which was critical of Hamilton. Philip and his friend both challenged Eacker to duels when he called them "damned rascals". Price's duel, also in Weehawken, New Jersey, resulted in nothing more than four missed shots, and Hamilton advised his son to delope – missing intentionally. However, both Philip and Eacker stood shotless for a minute after the command "present", then Philip leveled his pistol, causing Eacker to fire, mortally wounding Philip and sending his shot awry. The later duel between Burr and Hamilton took place near to the spot of the duel between Philip and Eacker.

=== Election of 1800 ===
Burr and Hamilton first came into public opposition during the 1800 presidential election. Burr and Jefferson ran for president on the Democratic-Republican Party ticket against incumbent President John Adams and his vice-presidential running mate, Charles C. Pinckney, of the Federalist Party. Electoral College rules at the time gave each elector two votes for president, and the candidate who received the second most votes became vice president.

The Democratic-Republican Party planned to have 72 of their 73 electors vote for Jefferson and Burr, with the remaining elector voting only for Jefferson. The electors failed to execute this plan, and Burr and Jefferson were tied with 73 votes each. The United States Constitution stipulated that if two candidates with an Electoral College majority were tied, the election would be moved to the House of Representatives—which at this time was controlled by the Federalists, many of whom were loath to vote for Jefferson. Although Hamilton had a long-standing rivalry with Jefferson stemming from their tenure as members of George Washington's cabinet, he regarded Burr as far more dangerous and used all his influence to ensure Jefferson's election. On the 36th ballot, the House of Representatives gave Jefferson the presidency, with Burr becoming vice president.

=== Charles Cooper's letter ===
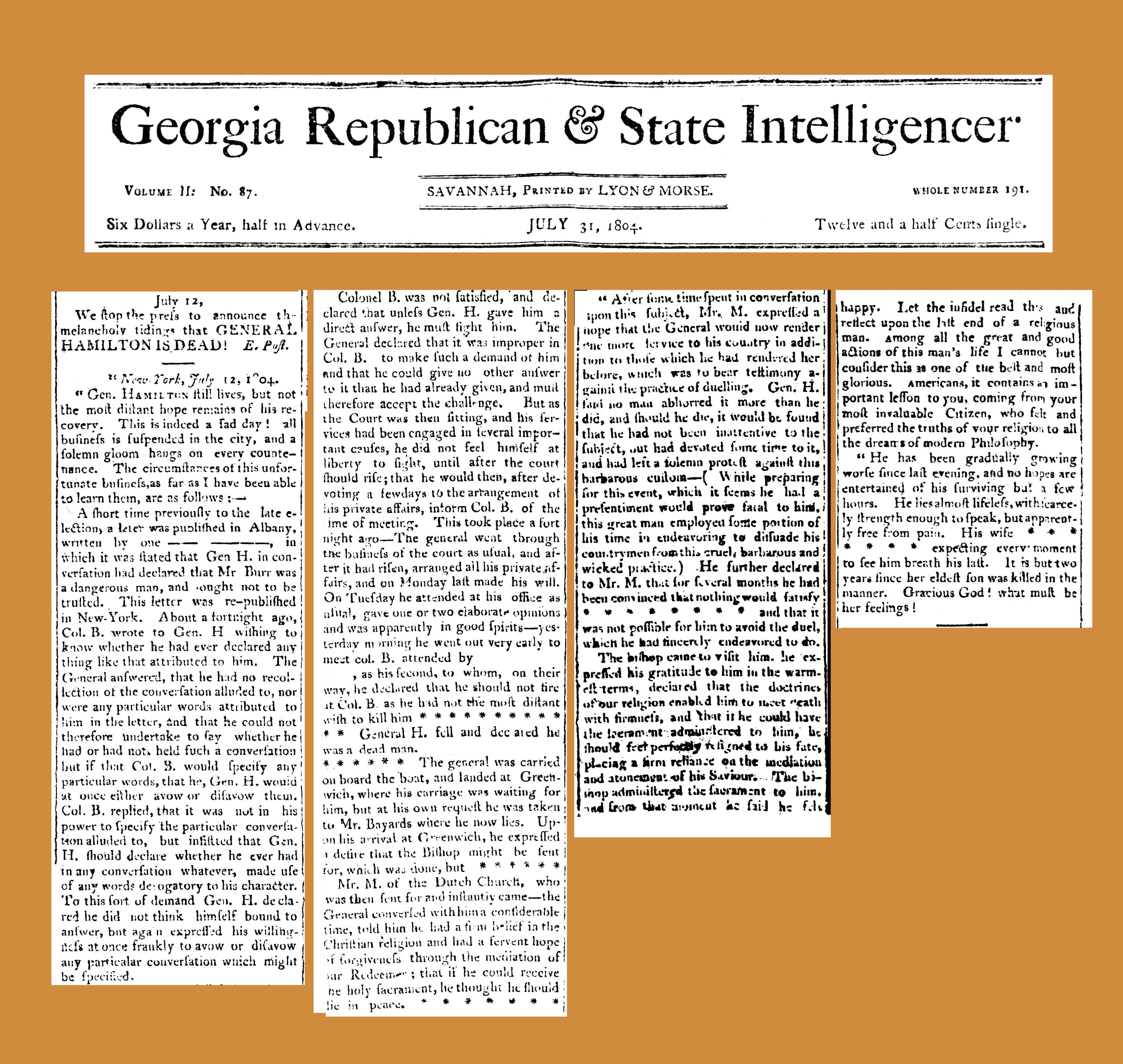
This July 31, 1804 article in the Georgia Republican & State Intelligencer reviewed the extended contentious communications between Burr and Hamilton that culminated in the duel, which the newspaper criticized as a "barbarous custom".

On April 24, 1804, the Albany Register newspaper published a letter opposing Burr's gubernatorial candidacy which was originally sent from Charles D. Cooper to Hamilton's father-in-law, former senator Philip Schuyler. It made reference to a previous statement by Cooper: "General Hamilton and Judge Kent have declared in substance that they looked upon Mr. Burr to be a dangerous man, and one who ought not be trusted with the reins of government." Cooper went on to emphasize that he could describe in detail "a still more despicable opinion which General Hamilton has expressed of Mr. Burr" at a political dinner.

Burr responded in a letter delivered by William Peter Van Ness which pointed particularly to the phrase "more despicable" and demanded "a prompt and unqualified acknowledgment or denial of the use of any expression which would warrant the assertion of Dr. Cooper." Hamilton's verbose reply on June 20 indicated that he could not be held responsible for Cooper's interpretation of his words (yet he did not fault that interpretation), concluding that he would "abide the consequences" should Burr remain unsatisfied. A recurring theme in their correspondence is that Burr seeks avowal or disavowal of anything that could justify Cooper's characterization, while Hamilton protests that there are no specifics.

Burr replied on June 21, also delivered by Van Ness, stating that "political opposition can never absolve gentlemen from the necessity of a rigid adherence to the laws of honor and the rules of decorum". Hamilton replied that he had "no other answer to give than that which has already been given". This letter was delivered to Nathaniel Pendleton on June 22 but did not reach Burr until June 25. The delay was due to negotiation between Pendleton and Van Ness in which Pendleton submitted the following paper:

General Hamilton says he cannot imagine what Dr. Cooper may have alluded, unless it were to a conversation at Mr. Taylor's, in Albany, last winter (at which he and General Hamilton were present). General Hamilton cannot recollect distinctly the particulars of that conversation, so as to undertake to repeat them, without running the risk of varying or omitting what might be deemed important circumstances. The expressions are entirely forgotten, and the specific ideas imperfectly remembered; but to the best of his recollection it consisted of comments on the political principles and views of Colonel Burr, and the results that might be expected from them in the event of his election as Governor, without reference to any particular instance of past conduct or private character.

Eventually, Burr issued a formal challenge and Hamilton accepted. Many historians have considered the causes of the duel to be flimsy and have thus characterized Hamilton as "suicidal", Burr as "malicious and murderous", or both. Thomas Fleming offers the theory that Burr may have been attempting to recover his honor by challenging Hamilton, whom he considered to be the only gentleman among his detractors, in response to the slanderous attacks against his character published during the 1804 gubernatorial campaign.

Hamilton's reasons for not engaging in a duel included his roles as father and husband, putting his creditors at risk and placing his family's welfare in jeopardy, but he felt that it would be impossible to avoid a duel because he had made attacks on Burr that he was unable to recant, and because of Burr's behavior prior to the duel. He attempted to reconcile his moral and religious reasons and the codes of honor and politics. Joanne Freeman speculates that Hamilton intended to accept the duel and purposefully miss his shot in order to satisfy his moral and political principles.

== Duel ==
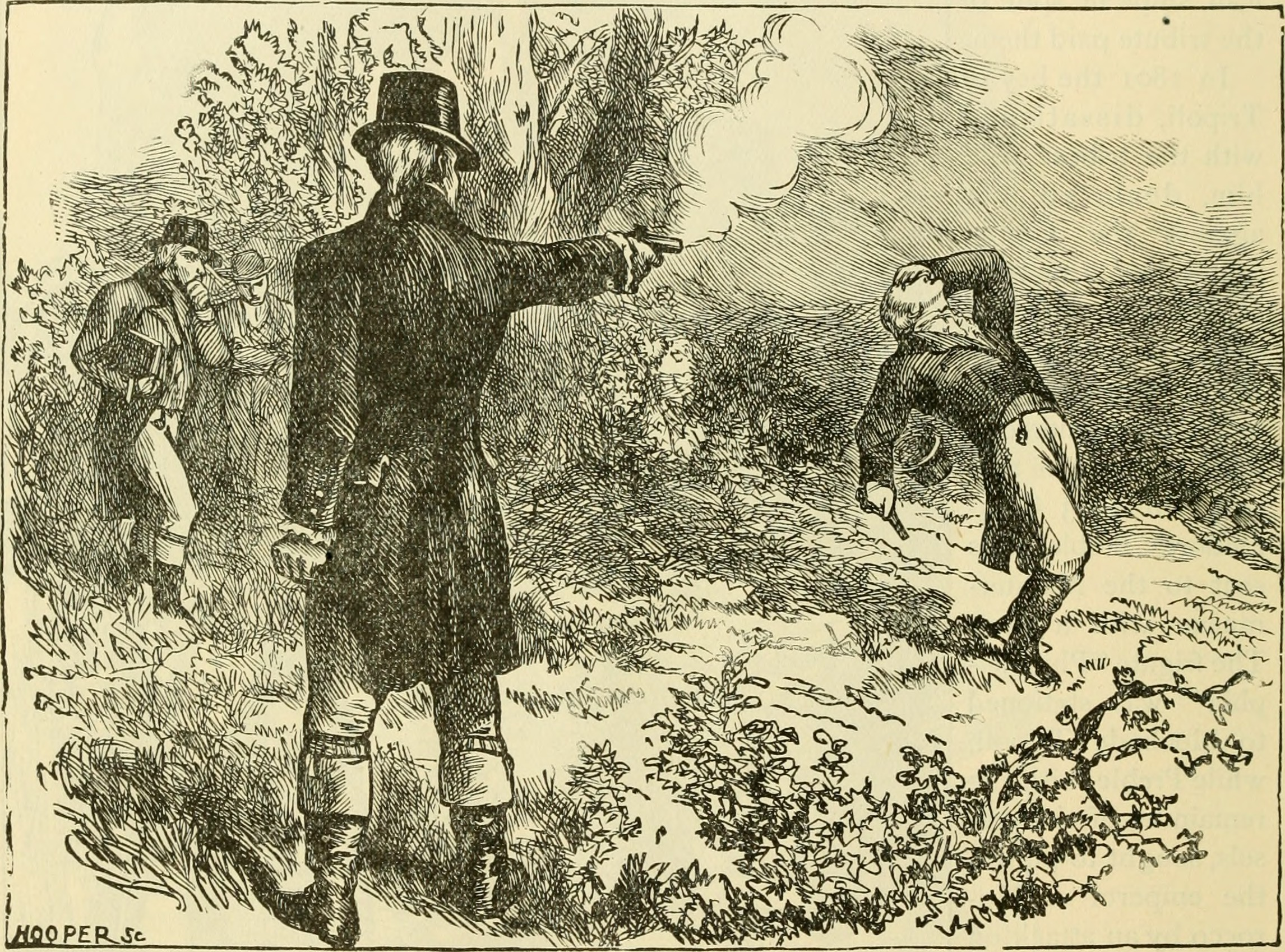
An artistic impression of Burr's shot of Hamilton

In the early morning of July 11, 1804, Burr and Hamilton departed from Manhattan by separate boats and rowed across the Hudson River to a spot known as the Heights of Weehawken, New Jersey, a popular dueling ground below the towering cliffs of the Palisades. Dueling had been prohibited in both New Jersey and New York, but Hamilton and Burr agreed to go to Weehawken because New Jersey was not as aggressive as New York in prosecuting dueling participants. The same site was used for eighteen known duels between 1700 and 1845, and it was not far from the site of the 1801 duel that resulted in the death of Hamilton's eldest son Philip. Burr and Hamilton also took steps to give all witnesses plausible deniability in an attempt to shield themselves from prosecution. For example, the pistols were transported to the island in a portmanteau, enabling the rowers to say under oath that they had not seen any pistols. They also stood with their backs to the duelists.

Burr, Van Ness (his second), Matthew L. Davis, another man often identified as John Swarthout and the rowers all reached the site at 6:30 a.m., whereupon Swarthout and Van Ness started to clear the underbrush from the dueling ground. Hamilton, Judge Nathaniel Pendleton (his second) and Dr. David Hosack arrived a few minutes before seven. Lots were cast for the choice of position and which second should start the duel. Both were won by Hamilton's second, who chose the upper edge of the ledge for Hamilton, facing the city. However, Joseph Ellis claims that Hamilton had been challenged and therefore had the choice of both weapon and position. Under this account, Hamilton himself chose the upstream or north side position.

Some first-hand accounts of the duel agree that two shots were fired, but some say only Burr fired, and the seconds disagreed on the intervening time between them. It was common for both principals in a duel to deliberately miss or fire their shot into the ground to exemplify courage (a practice known as deloping). The duel could then come to an end. Hamilton apparently fired a shot above Burr's head. Burr returned fire and hit Hamilton in the lower abdomen above the right hip. The large-caliber lead ball ricocheted off Hamilton's third or second false rib, fracturing it and causing considerable damage to his internal organs, particularly his liver and diaphragm, before lodging in his first or second lumbar vertebra. According to Pendleton's account, Hamilton collapsed almost immediately, dropping the pistol involuntarily, and Burr moved toward him in a speechless manner (which Pendleton deemed to be indicative of regret) before being hustled away behind an umbrella by Van Ness because Hosack and the rowers were already approaching.

It is entirely uncertain which principal fired first, as both seconds' backs were to the duel in accordance with the pre-arranged regulations so that they could testify that they "saw no fire". After much research to determine the actual events of the duel, historian Joseph Ellis thinks,

Hamilton did fire his weapon intentionally, and he fired first. But he aimed to miss Burr, sending his ball into the tree above and behind Burr's location. In so doing, he did not withhold his shot, but he did waste it, thereby honoring his pre-duel pledge. Meanwhile, Burr, who did not know about the pledge, did know that a projectile from Hamilton's gun had whizzed past him and crashed into the tree to his rear. According to the principles of the code duello, Burr was perfectly justified in taking deadly aim at Hamilton and firing to kill.

=== David Hosack's account ===
Hosack wrote his account on August 17, about one month after the duel had taken place. He testified that he had only seen Hamilton and the two seconds disappear "into the wood", heard two shots and rushed to find a wounded Hamilton. He also testified that he had not seen Burr, who had been hidden behind an umbrella by Van Ness. He gives a very clear picture of the events in a letter to William Coleman:

When called to him upon his receiving the fatal wound, I found him half sitting on the ground, supported in the arms of Mr. Pendleton. His countenance of death I shall never forget. He had at that instant just strength to say, "This is a mortal wound, doctor;" when he sunk away, and became to all appearance lifeless. I immediately stripped up his clothes, and soon, alas I ascertained that the direction of the ball must have been through some vital part. His pulses were not to be felt, his respiration was entirely suspended, and, upon laying my hand on his heart and perceiving no motion there, I considered him as irrecoverably gone. I, however, observed to Mr. Pendleton, that the only chance for his reviving was immediately to get him upon the water. We therefore lifted him up, and carried him out of the wood to the margin of the bank, where the bargemen aided us in conveying him into the boat, which immediately put off. During all this time I could not discover the least symptom of returning life. I now rubbed his face, lips, and temples with spirits of hartshorn, applied it to his neck and breast, and to the wrists and palms of his hands, and endeavoured to pour some into his mouth.

Hosack goes on to say that Hamilton had revived after a few minutes, either from the hartshorn or fresh air. He finishes his letter:

Soon after recovering his sight, he happened to cast his eye upon the case of pistols, and observing the one that he had had in his hand lying on the outside, he said, "Take care of that pistol; it is undischarged, and still cocked; it may go off and do harm. Pendleton knows" (attempting to turn his head towards him) "that I did not intend to fire at him." "Yes," said Mr. Pendleton, understanding his wish, "I have already made Dr. Hosack acquainted with your determination as to that." He then closed his eyes and remained calm, without any disposition to speak; nor did he say much afterward, except in reply to my questions. He asked me once or twice how I found his pulse; and he informed me that his lower extremities had lost all feeling, manifesting to me that he entertained no hopes that he should long survive.

=== Statement to the press ===
Pendleton and Van Ness issued a press statement about the events of the duel, which pointed out the agreed-upon dueling rules and events that transpired. It stated that both participants were free to open fire once they had been given the order to present. After first fire had been given, the opponent's second would count to three, whereupon the opponent would fire or sacrifice his shot. Pendleton and Van Ness disagree as to who fired the first shot, but they concur that both men had fired "within a few seconds of each other" (as they must have; neither Pendleton nor Van Ness mentions counting down).

In Pendleton's amended version of the statement, he and a friend went to the site of the duel the day after Hamilton's death to discover where Hamilton's shot went. The statement reads:

They ascertained that the ball passed through the limb of a cedar tree, at an elevation of about twelve feet and a half, perpendicularly from the ground, between thirteen and fourteen feet from the mark on which General Hamilton stood, and about four feet wide of the direct line between him and Col. Burr, on the right side; he having fallen on the left.

=== Hamilton's intentions ===
Hamilton wrote a letter before the duel titled Statement on Impending Duel with Aaron Burr in which he stated that he was "strongly opposed to the practice of dueling" for both religious and practical reasons. "I have resolved," it continued, "if our interview is conducted in the usual manner, and it pleases God to give me the opportunity, to reserve and throw away my first fire, and I have thoughts even of reserving my second fire."

Hamilton regained consciousness after being shot and told Hosack that his gun was still loaded and that "Pendleton knows I did not mean to fire at him." This is evidence for the theory that Hamilton intended not to fire, honoring his pre-duel pledge, and only fired accidentally upon being hit. Such an intention would have violated the protocol of the code duello and, when Burr learned of it, he responded: "Contemptible, if true." Hamilton could have thrown away his shot by firing into the ground, thus possibly signaling Burr of his purpose.

Modern historians have debated to what extent Hamilton's statements and letter represent his true beliefs, and how much of this was a deliberate attempt to permanently ruin Burr if Hamilton were killed. An example of this may be seen in what one historian has considered to be deliberate attempts to provoke Burr on the dueling ground:

Hamilton performed a series of deliberately provocative actions to ensure a lethal outcome. As they were taking their places, he asked that the proceedings stop, adjusted his spectacles, and slowly, repeatedly, sighted along his pistol to test his aim.

=== Burr's intentions ===
There is evidence that Burr intended to kill Hamilton. The afternoon after the duel, he was quoted as saying that he would have shot Hamilton in the heart had his vision not been impaired by the morning mist. English philosopher Jeremy Bentham met with Burr in England in 1808, four years after the duel, and Burr claimed to have been certain of his ability to kill Hamilton. Bentham concluded that Burr was "little better than a murderer."

There is also evidence in Burr's defense. Had Hamilton apologized for his "more despicable opinion of Mr. Burr", all would have been forgotten. However, the code duello required that injuries which needed an explanation or apology must be specifically stated. Burr's accusation was so unspecific that it could have referred to anything that Hamilton had said over fifteen years of political rivalry. Despite this, Burr insisted on an answer.

Burr knew of Hamilton's public opposition to his presidential run in 1800. Hamilton made confidential statements against him, such as those enumerated in his letter to U.S. Supreme Court Justice John Rutledge. In the attachment to that letter, Hamilton argued against Burr's character on numerous scores: he suspected Burr "on strong grounds of having corruptly served the views of the Holland Company"; "his very friends do not insist on his integrity"; "he will court and employ able and daring scoundrels"; he seeks "Supreme power in his own person" and "will in all likelihood attempt a usurpation" and so forth.

Burr held his head up and expressed few regrets, but he once remarked: "If I had read Sterne more, and Voltaire less, I should have known that the world was wide enough for Hamilton and me." This quote was used as the basis for the song The World Was Wide Enough, the musical number from the duel scene in the musical Hamilton.

=== Pistols ===
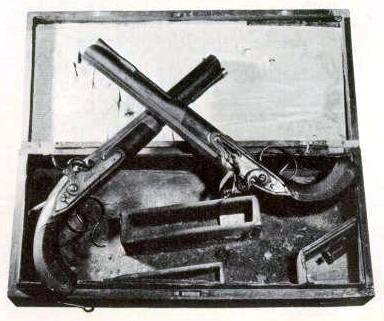
The Wogdon & Barton pistols used in the duel

The pistols used in the duel belonged to Hamilton's brother-in-law John Barker Church, who was a business partner of both Hamilton and Burr. Later legend claimed that these pistols were the same ones used in a 1799 duel between Church and Burr in which neither man was injured. Burr, however, wrote in his memoirs that he supplied the pistols for his duel with Church, and that they belonged to him.

The Wogdon & Barton dueling pistols incorporated a hair-trigger feature that could be set by the user. Hamilton was familiar with the weapons and would have been able to use the hair-trigger. However, Pendleton asked him before the duel whether he would use the "hair-spring", and Hamilton reportedly replied, "Not this time."

Hamilton's son Philip and George Eacker likely used the Church weapons in the 1801 duel in which Philip was killed, three years before the Burr–Hamilton duel. They were kept at Church's estate Belvidere until the late 19th century. During this time one of the pistols was modified, with its original flintlock mechanism replaced by a more modern caplock mechanism. This was done by Church's grandson for use in the American Civil War. Consequently, the pistols are no longer identical.

The pair were sold in 1930 to the Chase Manhattan Bank, now part of JP Morgan Chase, which traces its descent back to the Manhattan Company founded by Burr, and are on display in the bank's headquarters at 270 Park Avenue in New York City.

== Aftermath ==
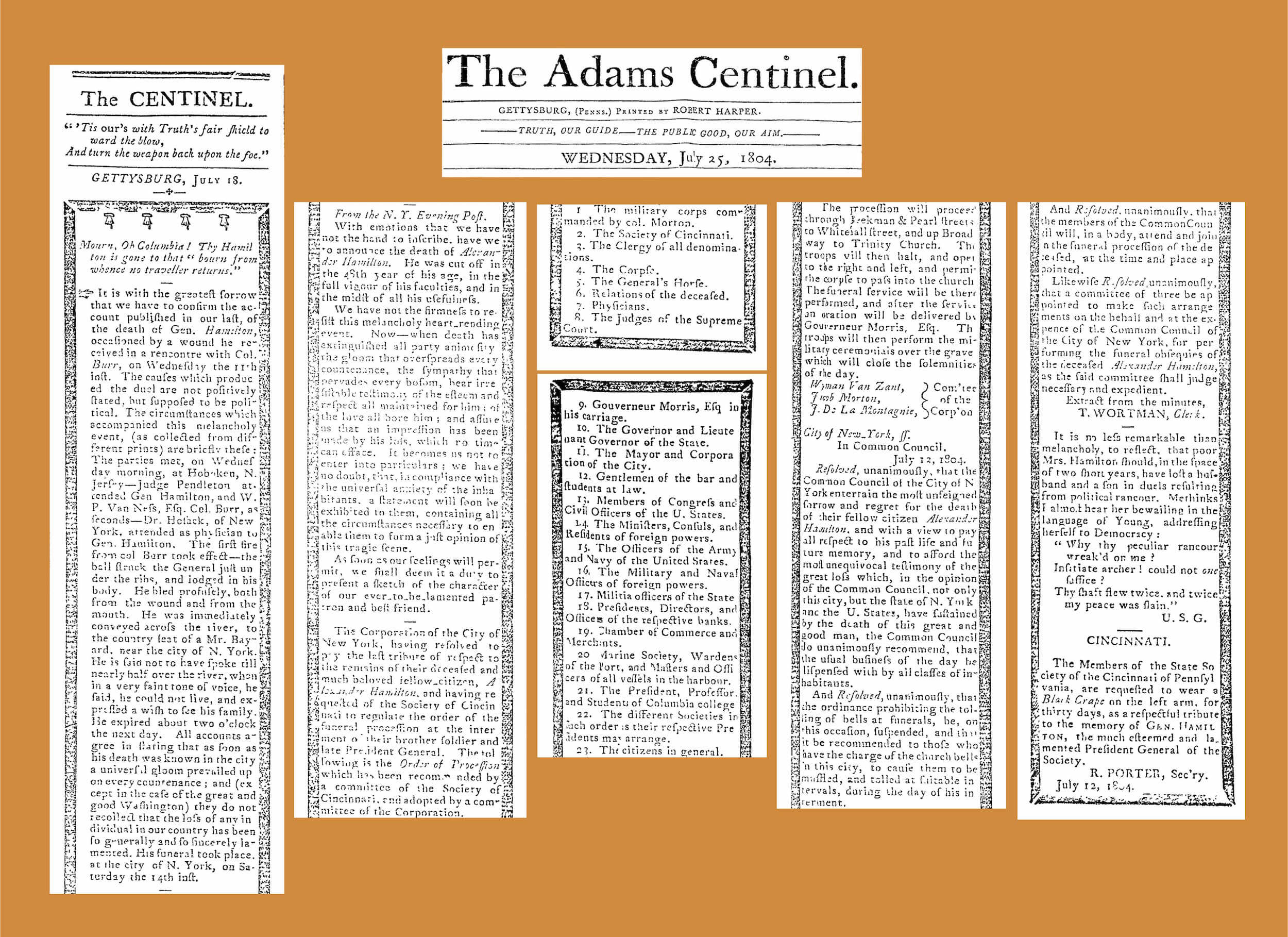
This July 25, 1804 article in The Adams Centinel expressed extreme lamentation over Hamilton's death, and described the plan for his funeral procession and other tributes, including a 30-day wearing of a commemorative black crepe armband by members of the Society of the Cincinnati of Pennsylvania, an organization Hamilton led as its president general.

Dr. Hosack immediately rushed to Hamilton, held by Nathanial Pendleton. To examine Hamilton, Hosack quickly cut away Hamilton's coat and shirt to locate the wound, but realized Hamilton was possibly right. Two men carry the mortally wounded Hamilton to a boat that moved them to the home of William Bayard Jr. in the present-day Greenwich Village section of New York City. There, they provide care to Hamilton, who was given communion by Bishop Benjamin Moore. Hamilton died the next day after seeing his wife Elizabeth and their children, in the presence of more than twenty friends and family members; he was buried in the Trinity Churchyard Cemetery in Manhattan. He was an Episcopalian at the time of his death.

Most pistol duels in the early 1800s did not end in fatalities. Thus the fact that Hamilton and his son Philip both died in pistol duels three years apart was notable. The events had striking similarities: the two duels were fought within several miles of each other, both men were struck in the lower abdomen above the right hip, both were attended by the same physician and both men were transported back to Manhattan after being wounded. Both men also died the day after their duels.

Following the duel, Burr fled to St. Simons Island, Georgia, where he stayed at the plantation of Pierce Butler, but he soon returned to Washington, D.C. to complete his term as vice president. He was charged with murder in New York and New Jersey, but neither charge ever reached trial. In Bergen County, New Jersey, in November 1804, a grand jury indicted Burr for murder, but the New Jersey Supreme Court quashed it on a motion from Colonel Samuel Ogden. Burr presided over the impeachment trial of Samuel Chase "with the dignity and impartiality of an angel, but with the rigor of a devil", according to a Washington newspaper. His heartfelt farewell speech to the Senate in March 1805 moved some of his harshest critics to tears.

=== Memorials and monuments ===
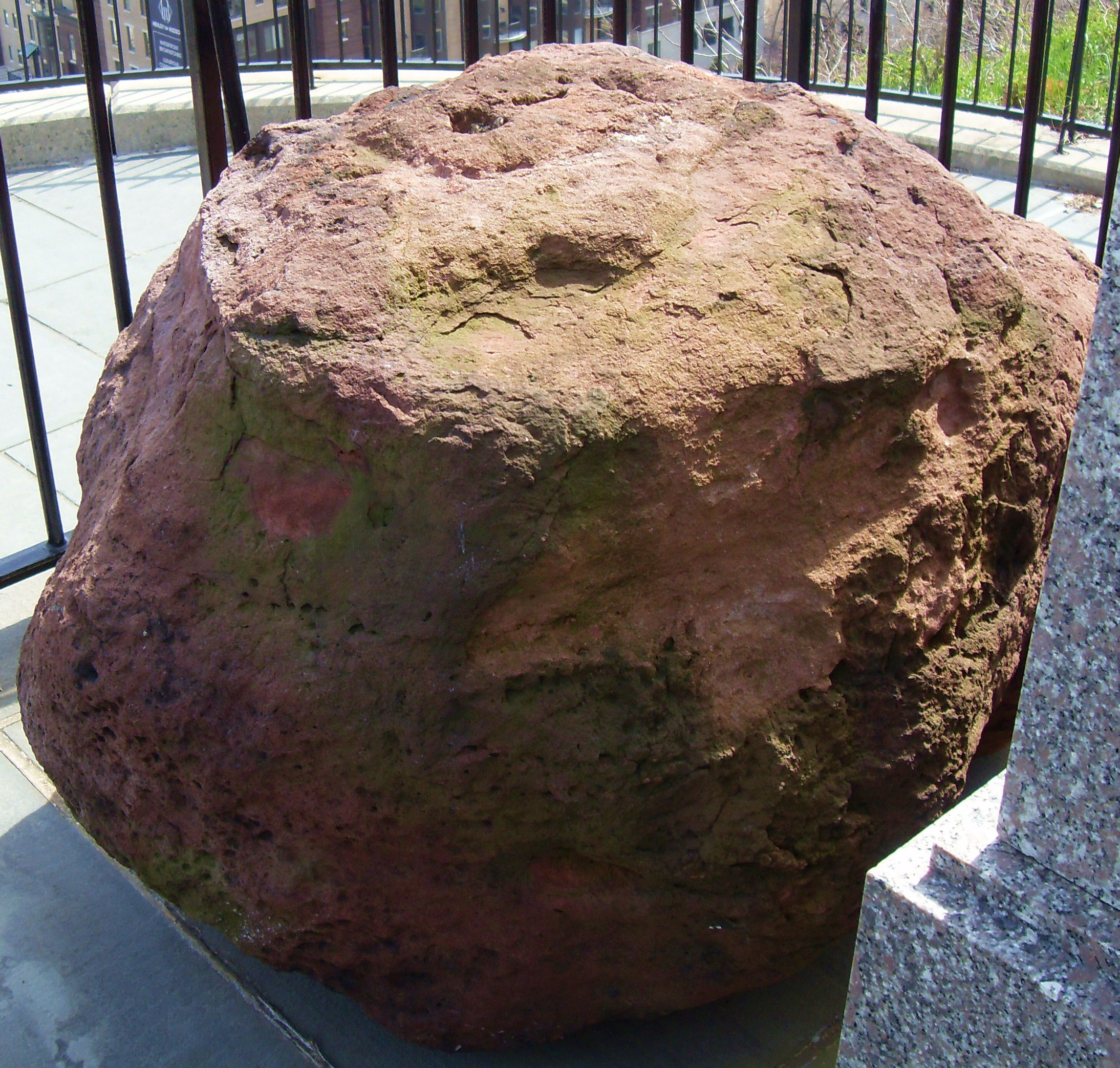
The boulder in Weehawken, New Jersey, where Hamilton is believed to have rested after being shot

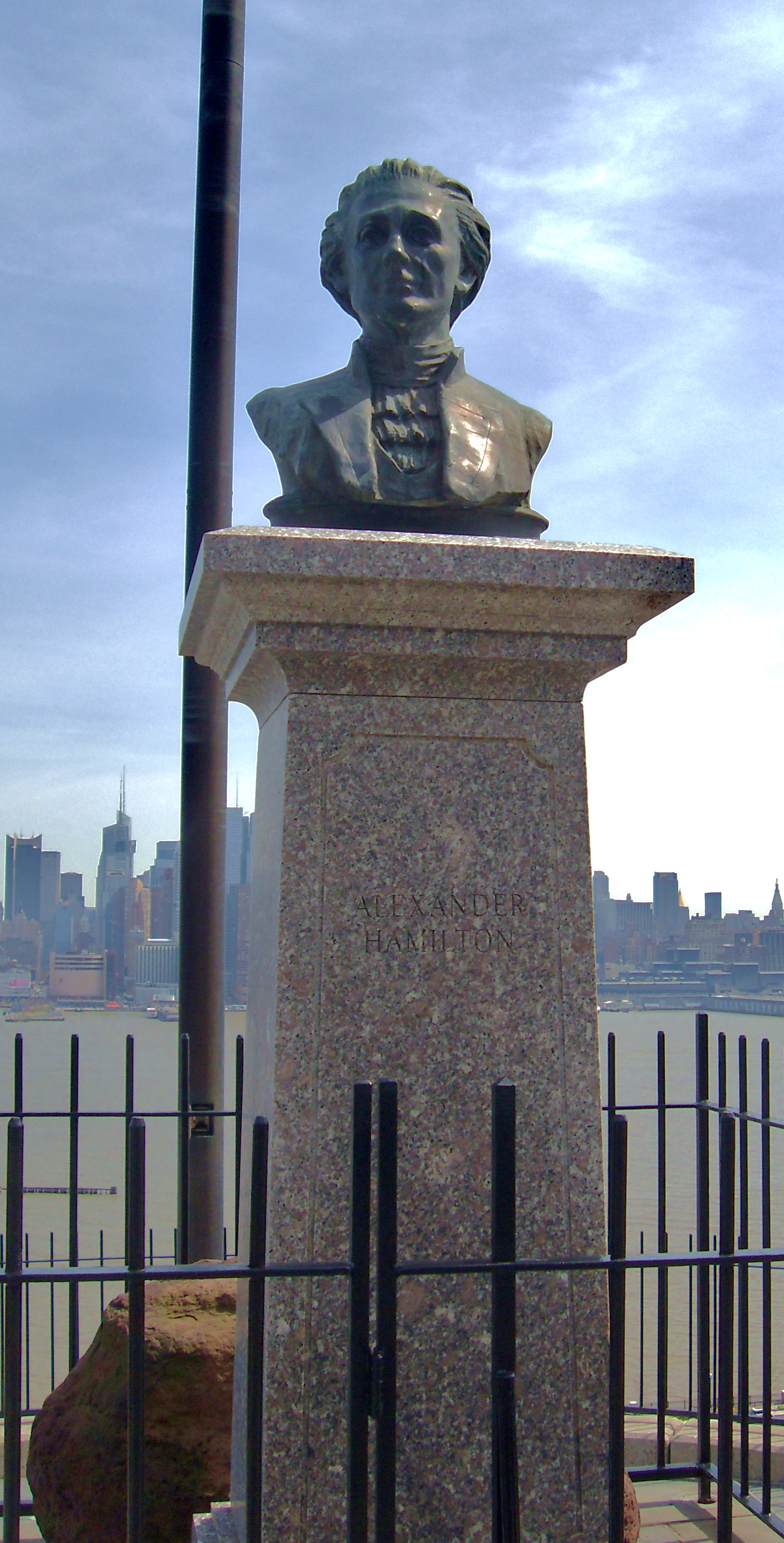
A 1935 bust of Hamilton

The first memorial to the duel was constructed in 1806 by the Saint Andrew's Society of the State of New York, of which Hamilton was a member. A fourteen-foot marble cenotaph was constructed where Hamilton was believed to have fallen, consisting of an obelisk topped by a flaming urn and a plaque with a quotation from Horace, the whole structure surrounded by an iron fence. Duels continued to be fought at the site and the marble was slowly vandalized and removed for souvenirs, with nothing remaining by 1820. The memorial's plaque survived, however, turning up in a junk store and finding its way to the New-York Historical Society in Manhattan, where it still resides.

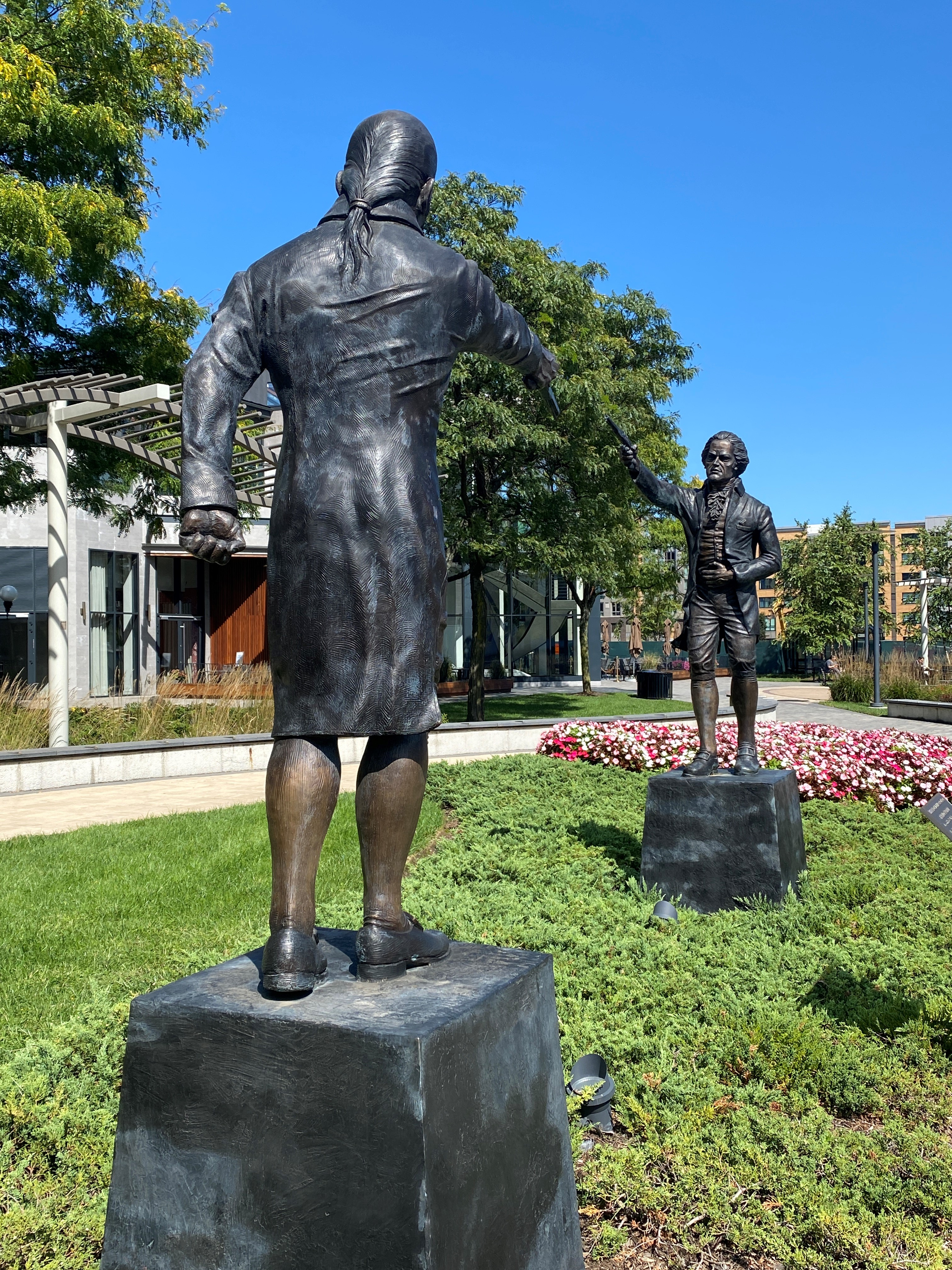
Monument erected at the site of the duel to commemorate the 215th anniversary, 2019

From 1820 to 1857, the site was marked by two stones with the names Hamilton and Burr placed where they were thought to have stood during the duel, but a road was built through the site in 1858 from Hoboken to Fort Lee; all that remained of those memorials was an inscription on a boulder where Hamilton was thought to have rested after the duel, but there are no primary accounts which confirm the boulder anecdote. Railroad tracks were laid directly through the site in 1870, and the boulder was hauled to the top of the Palisades, where it remains today. An iron fence was built around the boulder in 1874, supplemented by a bust of Hamilton and a plaque. The bust was thrown over the cliff on October 14, 1934, by vandals and the head was never recovered; a new bust was installed on July 12, 1935. The plaque was stolen by vandals in the 1980s and an abbreviated version of the text was inscribed on the indentation left in the boulder, which remained until the 1990s when a granite pedestal was added in front of the boulder and the bust was moved to the top of the pedestal. New markers were added on July 11, 2004, the 200th anniversary of the duel.

=== Anti-dueling movement in New York state ===
In the months and years following the duel, a movement started to end the practice. Eliphalet Nott, the pastor at an Albany church attended by Hamilton's father-in-law, Philip Schuyler, gave a sermon that was soon reprinted, "A Discourse, Delivered in the North Dutch Church, in the City of Albany, Occasioned by the Ever to be Lamented Death of General Alexander Hamilton, July 29, 1804". In 1806, Lyman Beecher delivered an anti-dueling sermon, later reprinted in 1809 by the Anti-Dueling Association of New York. The covers and some pages of both pamphlets:

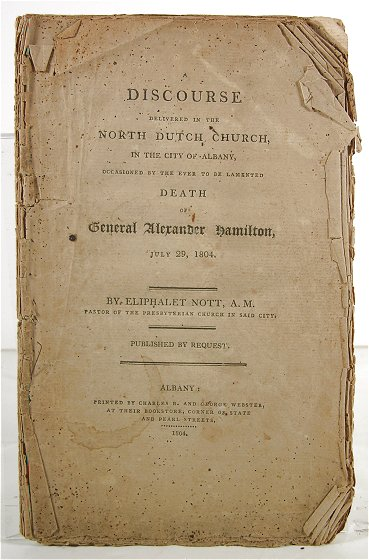
1804 Anti-dueling sermon by an acquaintance of Alexander Hamilton

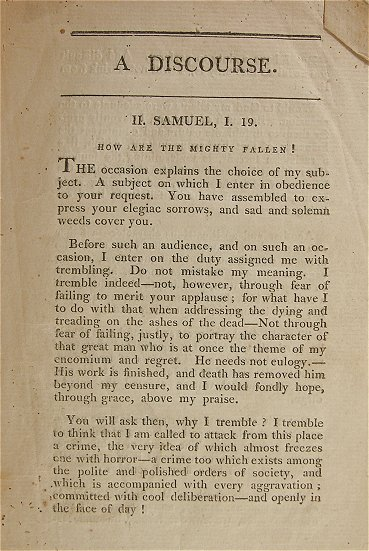
Opening text of 1804 sermon

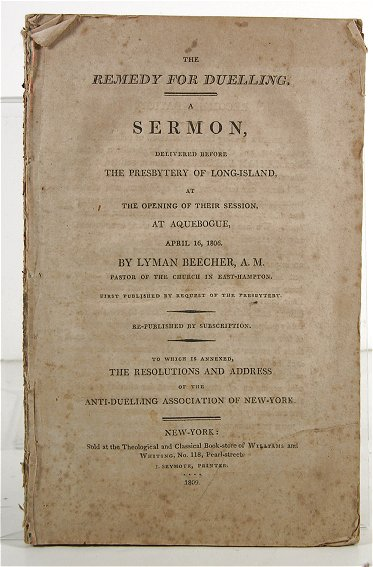
Anti-Dueling Association of New York pamphlet, Remedy, 1809

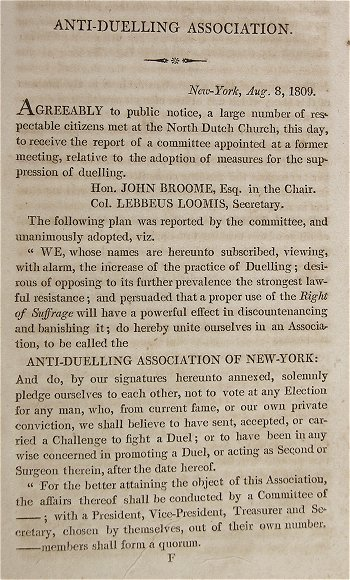
Resolutions, Anti-Dueling Association of N.Y., from Remedy pamphlet, 1809

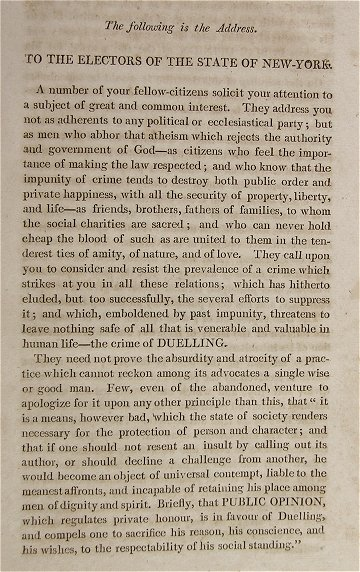
Address to the electorate, from Remedy pamphlet

== In popular culture ==
The Broadway musical Hamilton, a dramatized biography of Hamilton, depicts the duel in its penultimate scene, featuring the song "The World Was Wide Enough". The musical's songs "Alexander Hamilton" and "Your Obedient Servant" also refer to the duel; and the rules of dueling researched by historian Joanne B. Freeman provided inspiration for the song "Ten Duel Commandments". The musical compresses the timeline for Burr and Hamilton's grievance, depicting Burr's challenge as a result of Hamilton's endorsement of Jefferson for president in 1800 rather than the New York gubernatorial election of 1804. The duel scene depicts a resolved Hamilton who intentionally aims his pistol at the sky while Burr takes the chance and fires his shot, mortally wounding Hamilton. Burr is portrayed as extremely remorseful about the duel and well aware that his legacy has been tarnished.

Descendants of Burr and Hamilton held a re-enactment of the duel near the Hudson River for the duel's bicentennial in 2004. Douglas Hamilton, fifth great-grandson of Alexander Hamilton, faced Antonio Burr, a descendant of Aaron Burr's cousin. More than 1,000 people attended the event, including an estimated sixty descendants of Hamilton and forty members of the Aaron Burr Association. The Alexander Hamilton Awareness Society has been hosting the Celebrate Hamilton program since 2012 to commemorate the Burr–Hamilton Duel and Hamilton's life and legacy.

In his historical novel Burr (1973), author Gore Vidal recreates an elderly Aaron Burr revisiting the dueling ground in Weehawken. Burr begins to reflect, for the benefit of the novel's protagonist, upon what precipitated the duel, and then, to the unease of his one-person audience, acts out the duel itself. The chapter concludes with Burr describing the personal, public and political consequences he endures in the duel's aftermath.

The duel is the focus of the 1993 advertisement that launched the Got Milk? campaign. In the advertisement, a history buff with a vast collection of Burr–Hamilton memorabilia, portrayed by actor Sean Whalen, is offered a chance to win $10,000 for answering the question, "Who shot Alexander Hamilton in that famous duel?"; however, he is unable to answer the question because his mouth is full of peanut butter and he has no milk to wash it down. The ad appeared on several lists of the best advertisements of all time, and in 2009 was inducted into the Clio Awards Hall of Fame.

== See also ==
- List of duels in the United States
- List of feuds in the United States
