= Deloping =

Throwing away one's first shot in a duel

Delope is the practice of deliberately wasting one's first shot in a pistol duel, an attempt to abort the conflict. The Irish code duello forbids the practice. Although some sources state that the term derives from French, the etymology is uncertain.

== Notable uses ==
- Alexander Hamilton, a 19th-century American politician, is thought to have attempted to delope during his infamous duel on July 11, 1804, with Aaron Burr, the Vice President of the United States. Rather than firing into the ground (as was customary in a delope), Hamilton intentionally fired into the air over Burr's head. Burr, perhaps misunderstanding his opponent's intent, fired at Hamilton and mortally wounded him. Burr and Hamilton's mutual animosity was such that it is not out of the question that Burr understood what Hamilton was doing but intentionally shot to kill or at least draw blood. Other historians have proposed that Burr shot first and the wounded Hamilton reflexively pulled the trigger, which would not be an instance of deloping. Ron Chernow's 2004 biography Alexander Hamilton gives that version. According to Chernow's account, the shots were all but simultaneous, with Burr's coming first according to one of the two witnesses (the other witness claimed that Hamilton had fired first, and that Burr waited several seconds for the smoke to clear before he returned fire). Chernow noted that Hamilton, in a note left behind in case he died, claimed to have intended to throw away his first shot, which Burr would later call "contemptible, if true". Regardless of its accuracy, Burr certainly had no way of knowing. Hamilton's eldest son, Philip, had died in a duel against George Eacker three years earlier. According to legend, the elder Hamilton had advised his son to delope as well.
- William Pitt the Younger, a British prime minister, chose to delope to indicate "moral superiority" since he had been forced into a duel with George Tierney, another Member of Parliament.
- On April 8, 1826, Henry Clay and John Randolph of Roanoke fought a duel in Arlington, Virginia. Randolph's first shot missed, while Clay's left a hole in Randolph's overcoat. On the second round, Clay missed and Randolph fired into the air, after which the two men were reconciled. Randolph purportedly extended his hand and said "You owe me a coat, Mr. Clay." Clay is reported to have replied, "I am glad the debt is no greater."
- Wellington–Winchilsea duel. On March 21, 1829, Arthur Wellesley, 1st Duke of Wellington, the British Prime Minister (January 22, 1828, to November 16, 1830), fought a duel with the Earl of Winchilsea. Wellington fired wide and later stated that he had deloped. Supporters of his opponent claimed he had aimed to kill Winchilsea, who was saved only by Wellington's poor marksmanship. Winchilsea discharged his pistol into the air.
- Joseph Howe, Nova Scotian journalist, politician, and public servant, deloped during a duel against John C. Halliburton, son of Judge Brenton Halliburton in 1840.

== In fiction ==
- In Fyodor Dostoevsky's novel Demons, the character Nikolai Stavrogin deliberately shoots his pistol multiple times into the air during a duel with Artemy Gaganov, leaving the latter deeply angered and insulted.
- In the 1958 film The Big Country, the character played by Gregory Peck contemptuously delopes when his opponent first fires prematurely and then cowers in fear.
- In the duel scene of the 1975 film Love and Death, the character played by Woody Allen shoots in the air (and hits a bird) after his opponent fires.
- In the 1975 film Barry Lyndon, the title character is challenged to a duel by his stepson Lord Bullingdon. A preliminary coin flip gives Lord Bullingdon the privilege of first shot, but he prematurely misfires because of his inexperience with firearms. Barry fires into the ground honourably and hopefully, but Bullingdon demands a second round in which Barry's leg is critically shot and requires amputation below the knee.
- In Flashman, by George MacDonald Fraser, the title character and scoundrel Harry Paget Flashman gets into a duel with a fellow officer over a woman. He promises a huge bribe to the officer responsible for loading the pistols to ensure that his opponent's pistol has gunpowder but no bullet. When his opponent appears to miss, Flashman makes a great show of deloping but accidentally shoots the top off of an attending doctor's brandy bottle and so wins renown as a crack shot as well as a gentleman. When his opponent angrily accuses Flashman of mocking him by deloping, he responds, "I didn't presume to tell you where to aim your shot; don't tell me where I should have aimed mine". He later blithely refuses to pay the bribe by noting that the loader cannot publicly complain of bad faith without admitting to a capital crime.
- In Episode 3, Book 1, of the television miniseries North and South, the character Charles Main fights a duel in which his opponent fires first, misses and collapses in fear while he waits for Main's return shot. Main delopes and is surprised when the spectators applaud him. They view his conduct as both courageous and generous since he refrained from killing his opponent, who has shown himself to be a coward.
- In the original Star Trek series episode "The Squire of Gothos", the alien being Trelane forces Captain Kirk's party to remain on his planet. Kirk challenges him to a duel. Trelane agrees and produces a pair of pistols that are copies of those from the Burr–Hamilton duel. Trelane delopes and declares himself at Kirk's mercy. Kirk then fires past Trelane into the mirror which appears to be the source of Trelane's power. That has the desired effect of allowing the crew members to escape.
- In AMC's Turn: Washington's Spies Season 1 Episode 7 "Mercy Moment Murder Measure", John Simcoe delopes after Abraham Woodhull misses and Anna Strong and Judge Woodhull try to intervene. Woodhull demands a reload, but the duel is halted.
- In the BBC series Garrow's Law, based upon the real-life 18th-century barrister and reformer, William Garrow hot-headedly challenges fellow barrister Silvester to a duel but is informed by his instructing attorney, John Southouse, that Silvester is a crack-shot with a pistol. On the morning of the duel, Garrow delopes by firing wide in the hope of ending the duel but is ordered by Silvester to stand his ground or to "risk being considered a poltroon." Silvester fires only a deliberately-glancing blow to the arm with the intention of teaching Garrow a lesson.
- In The Custom of the Army, a novella by Diana Gabaldon, Lord John Grey delopes during a duel with Edwin Nicolls.
- In The Even Chance, the first episode of ITV's Horatio Hornblower adaptation, the title character delopes despite being wounded by his opponent, who deliberately shot before the command to fire and falsely claimed it was an accident.
- The 2015 musical Hamilton in which duelling and deloping are themes throughout the story, features dramatisations of the Eacker–Hamilton and Burr–Hamilton duels.
- In the fourth episode of the first season of the Netflix drama Bridgerton, the Duke of Hastings chooses to delope and fires upwards in his duel since he believes that he wronged his opponent by dishonouring his sister.
