= Chatham Street Theatre =

Chatham Street Theatre may refer to either of two former theaters on Chatham Street (now Park Row) in New York City:

- Chatham Theatre, opened 1839, demolished 1862
- Chatham Garden Theatre, opened 1824, converted in 1832 to the Free Presbyterian Chatham Street Chapel, which became a hotel and was later demolished
