= George Eacker =

American lawyer (1774-1804)

George I. Eacker
- Born: c. 1774; Palatine, Province of New York, British America
- Died: January 4, 1804 (aged 29–30); New York City, U.S.
- Resting place: New York City
- Education: Columbia College (1793)
- Occupation: New York lawyer
- Parent(s): Jacob Eacker; Anna Margaret Finck

George I. Eacker (c. 1774 – January 4, 1804) was a New York lawyer. He is best known for having fatally shot Philip Hamilton, the eldest son of Alexander Hamilton and Elizabeth Schuyler Hamilton, in a duel on November 23, 1801, in Weehawken, New Jersey.

== Early life and education ==
Eacker was born in Palatine in what was then the colonial-era Province of New York. He was the son of Jacob Eacker, a German immigrant who fought in the American Revolution, served as a county judge, and a member of the New York State Assembly, and Anna Margaret Finck, daughter of Andreas Finck and the sister of Andrew Fink Jr, who rose to the rank of Major during the war. George had one younger brother, Jacob I., and four sisters.

He attended a preparatory school in Schenectady, New York, and graduated from Columbia College in 1793. He then studied law under Henry Brockholst Livingston, a future Associate Justice of the Supreme Court of the United States.

== Career ==
Eacker was admitted to the New York bar at 21 and quickly established himself as one of New York City’s premier attorneys. He soon built his practice in Manhattan into a lucrative business, which allowed him to take a house on Wall Street and to employ a married couple as his valet and housekeeper. He gained popularity in New York City's well-to-do social circles as a lawyer, Freemason, cavalry captain, and fire brigade inspector.

For an unknown offense in 1798, which the historian Eric Henry Monkkonen interprets as an earlier duel or conflict, Eacker appeared in court and paid a recognizance, likely as a bond for good behavior.

In 1801, Eacker was appointed as a master in the New York Court of Chancery, which was the highest court in the state.

== Duels with Stephen Price and Philip Hamilton ==
Eacker was selected in 1801 to deliver the Fourth of July oration at an Independence Day celebration held in New York City by a brigade of the New York State Militia, the Tammany Society, and two of the city's labor organizations: the Mechanics' Society and Coopers' Society. The Tammany Society, better known as Tammany Hall, was a Democratic-Republican Party political organization that Aaron Burr had built into a political machine. In politics, Eacker was known to be aligned with Burr, which automatically placed him at odds with Alexander Hamilton and the Federalists.

According to a supporter, the speech that Eacker delivered was commended by "nearly everybody" except for Federalist partisans, who were "blinded... to every virtue" by "party spirit, which at that time was very bitter", and believed it implied that Hamilton sought power at any cost, while Thomas Jefferson upheld the Constitution. Some accounts questioned whether the speech was critical of Alexander Hamilton, as was later characterized. According to a 19th-century historian who relied on Eacker's younger brother as a source, the speech was entirely patriotic and did not name or allude to Hamilton.

On November 20, 1801, a Friday night, Eacker attended a play at the Park Theatre with his fiancée Harriet Livingston, a daughter of Walter Livingston and Cornelia Schuyler. Philip Hamilton, the eldest son of Alexander Hamilton, and Stephen Price approached or entered Eacker's box together and loudly ridiculed him. Eacker called them "damned rascals"—a severe insult at the time. In response to that insult, as was then common, both challenged Eacker to a duel.

Price faced the 27-year-old Eacker in a duel in Weehawken, New Jersey, on November 22, 1801. Four shots were exchanged, but neither party was injured, and the matter was settled.

At the same location on the following day, Eacker fatally shot the 19-year-old Hamilton in a second duel. Hamilton refused to raise his pistol to fire after he and Eacker had counted ten paces and faced each other, following his father's instructions to reserve his fire. Eacker, determined to fire second, did not shoot. After a minute, Eacker finally raised his pistol, and Hamilton did the same. Eacker shot and struck Philip above his right hip. The bullet went through his body and lodged in his left arm. In what may have been an involuntary spasm, Hamilton fired his pistol in the air.

In a letter to Rufus King, Robert Troup wrote of Alexander Hamilton, "Never did I see a man so completely overwhelmed with grief as Hamilton had been." Nevertheless, he was said to be civil and professional in his later relationship with Eacker. Hamilton would die in a duel with Aaron Burr only a few years later, on July 11, 1804, on the same dueling ground in Weehawken.

== Death and legacy ==
Following the duel, Eacker resumed his life as a prominent lawyer and active community member. However, according to Eacker's brother, George Eacker fought a raging fire as part of his fire brigade duties on a bitterly cold night in January 1802, two months after the duel. He was soaked to the skin, and his clothes froze. This severe exposure led to a lingering illness that developed into tuberculosis (then known as consumption).

As his health deteriorated, some speculated that grief over the duel had contributed to his decline, but his brother later stated that George never regretted his actions and would have dueled again under the same circumstances.

Eacker died on January 4, 1804, at the age of 30. His funeral was a grand event, featuring military honors and participation from the fire brigade, the Howard Lodge of Freemasons, and various civic leaders. His remains were interred in the graveyard behind St. Paul’s Chapel, and a volley of musketry was fired over his grave.

Eacker and his fiancée never married. In January 1808, Harriet Livingston married the steamboat inventor Robert Fulton with whom she had four children.

== In popular culture ==
Eacker appears as a minor character in the 2015 Broadway musical Hamilton in which the musical number "Blow Us All Away" dramatizes his duel with Philip Hamilton. The role of Eacker originated on Broadway by a member of the show's ensemble, Ephraim M. Sykes, who also appears as Eacker on the original cast recording.

== See also ==
- List of people killed in duels
