= Edmund Simpson =

American actor

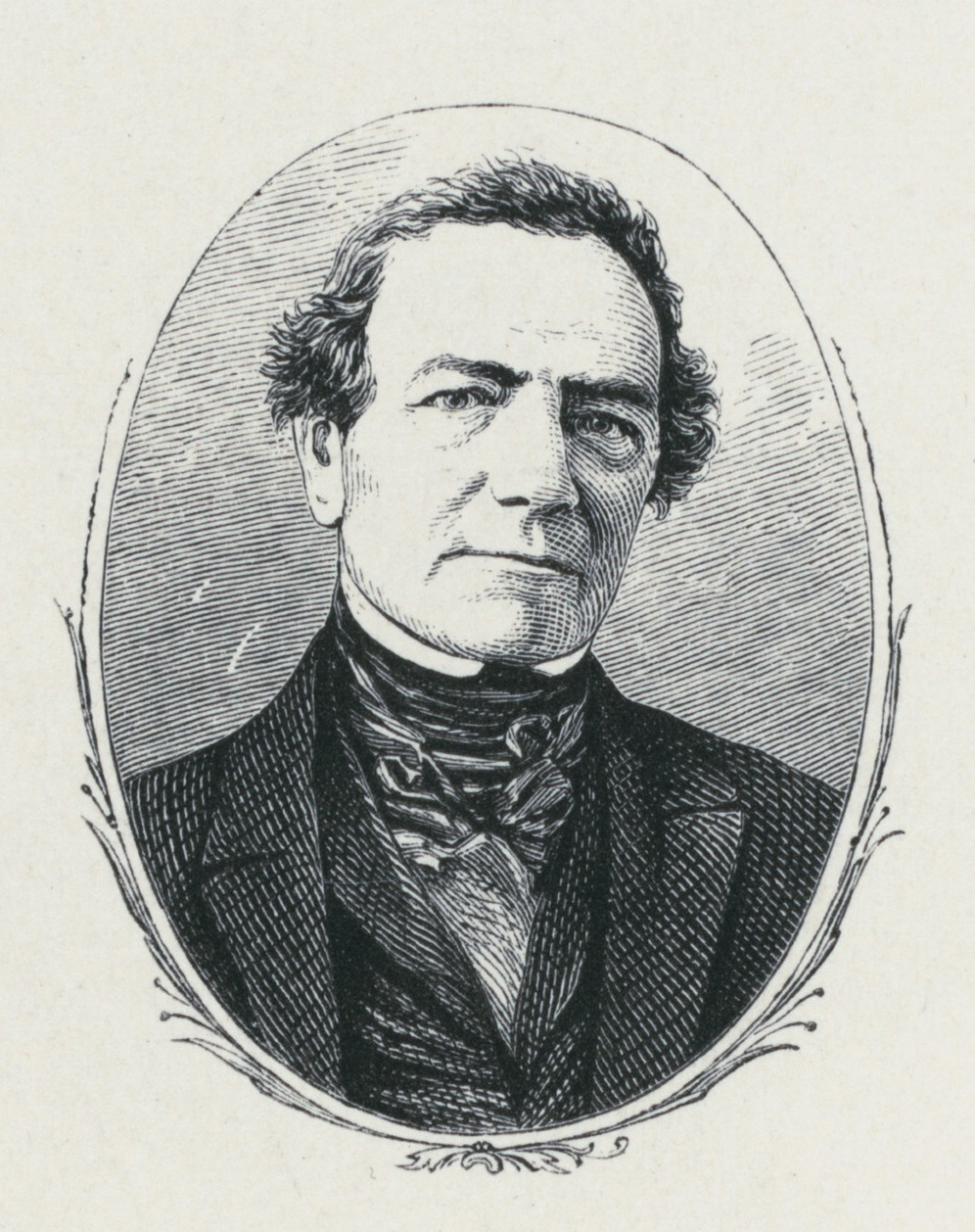
Edmund Simpson

Edmund Shaw Simpson (1784 – 31 July 1848) was an English-born actor and theater manager. He made his theatrical début at the Towcester Theatre in England in May 1806 as Baron Steinfort in August von Kotzebue's The Stranger. In the United States Simpson first appeared at the New York Park Theatre on 22 October 1809, as Hurry Dornton in The Road to Ruin. In 1828, when playing lead role in The Tragical History of Doctor Faustus, one of his legs was broken by an accident to the stage machinery, and he was crippled for life. His last performance was Dazzle in London Assurance. As a comedian, Simpson was studious and painstaking, and in his delineations intelligent and respectable, but there was ever attached to his representations a hardness of manner that interfered with his popularity.

In 1810 he became stage manager, and remained permanently connected with the one playhouse as actor, stage manager, and manager for 38 years. It was his privilege to introduce nearly all the noted British players of his day to American audiences. From 1821 until 1840 Simpson was working-manager to Stephen Price, the lessee of the theatre, but on the death of Price he assumed the sole management. During his career he went through several trials of adversity, and finally retired, 6 June 1848, under discouragement and in reduced circumstances.

Under Simpson's direction the old Park Theatre, or "The Theatre," as the show-bills named it, was noted for its well-drilled and efficient stock company. The scenery of this noted resort was made up of flats and drops of the simplest construction, the properties were cheap, worn, and few in number, the costumes flimsy and tinselled, and the auditorium, before the rising of the curtain, usually filled with the stifling leakage of gas. The boxes were painted in white and gold, with the first and second tiers divided into a series of screened lock-boxes.

A separate stairway led to the third tier and the gallery. This third tier was an assembling-place for the dissolute of both sexes; one half the gallery was patronized by boys, servants, and sailors, and the remainder was devoted to the accommodation of Negroes. What is now known as the parterre was called the pit. It was fitted with hard wooden benches, and the admission to it was half-price. Here the bachelors, critics, and wits of the day found their places. Drinking bars, united with apple, pie, and peanut stands, were connected with the pit and the upper tier of boxes.

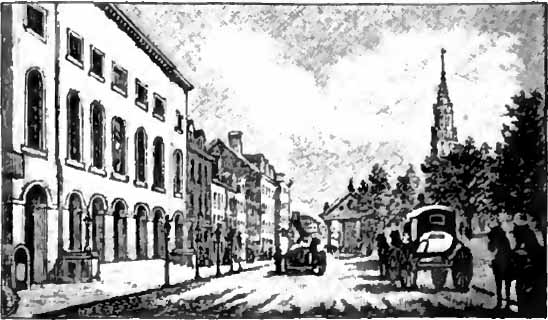
The old Park Theatre

As Frances Trollope has truly pictured, it was not an uncommon thing to see men rise on the front rows of the dress-circle in their shirt-sleeves, and between the acts turn their backs to the audience, while their better-halves sat munching apples and peeling oranges. Not seldom the entertainments of an evening comprised a five-act tragedy, a comedy, and an olio diversion, that terminated at twelve or one o'clock. The old Park Theatre was a wooden, barn-like structure, fronting about eighty feet on Park row, and rising to the height of sixty or seventy feet, painted in imitation of blocks of granite.
