= Clay–Randolph duel =

1826 pistol duel in Virginia, US

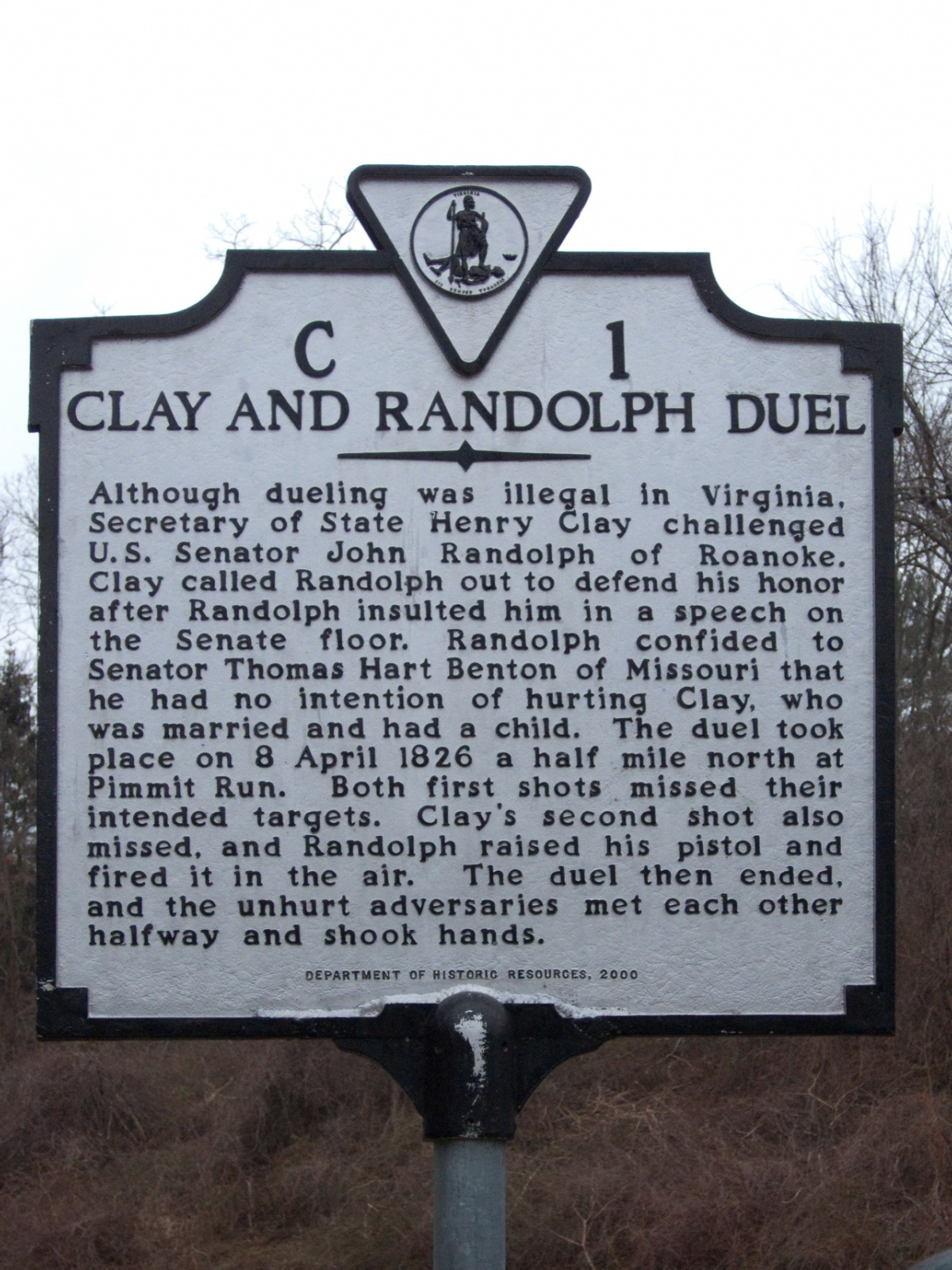
- historic marker of the event
- Date: April 8, 1823

On the evening of April 8, 1826, Secretary of State Henry Clay challenged U.S. Senator John Randolph of Roanoke to a pistol duel after Randolph insulted him in a speech on the Senate floor. The duel took place in a dense forest on the Virginia side of the Potomac River above the Chain Bridge. When the sign was given to start, Clay's shot missed John Randolph by a distance that convinced observers he had not intended to hit his purported target. He also missed Clay due to a misfire. They dismissed the accident and counted off again. He pierced John Randolph's white Overcoat but did not injure him. Randolph, not wanting to continue, shot his gun into the air as an act of honor. The duel ended with no injuries as both men missed their shots and John Randolph said, "You owe me a coat, Mr. Clay."

== Background ==
On March 30, 1826, during a four-hour Senate floor speech, John Randolph of Roanoke delivered a insult of the John Quincy Adams administration. Randolph famously characterized the alliance between Adams and Henry Clay as a "combination, unheard of till then, of the puritan with the blackleg," a remark that directly attacked Clay’s integrity by likening him to a cheating gambler. Clay, angered by the personal nature of the statement, issued a formal challenge to a duel shortly afterward. the duel was appointed for April 8, each bringing a second and a surgeon in case of an injury. They met near the Potomac River north of Little Falls Bridge (now Chain Bridge). General Thomas Sidney Jesup called for the start of the duel. Clay and Randolph each took 30 paces before turning to face each other. Clay took the first shot and missed Randolph. Randolph's shot missed Clay and hit a stump as his gun misfired. Henry Clay dismissed the misfire and ordered another round. Again, Clay took the first shot piercing Randolph's coat but did not injure him. Randolph shot his gun into the air away from Clay as a sign of honor. The duel finished without anyone being injured.

== Aftermath ==
After the duel ended without injury or death, Henry Clay shook hands with John Randolph and said, "I trust in God, my dear sir, you are untouched; after what has occurred, I would not have harmed you for a thousand words." Randolph replied, "Mr. Clay, You owe me a new coat." To which Henry Clay replied, "I am glad the debt is no greater." The two men resumed professional relations, and faced no legal repercussions for violating anti-dueling laws.
