= Stephen Price (theatre manager) =

American theatre manager (1782–1840)

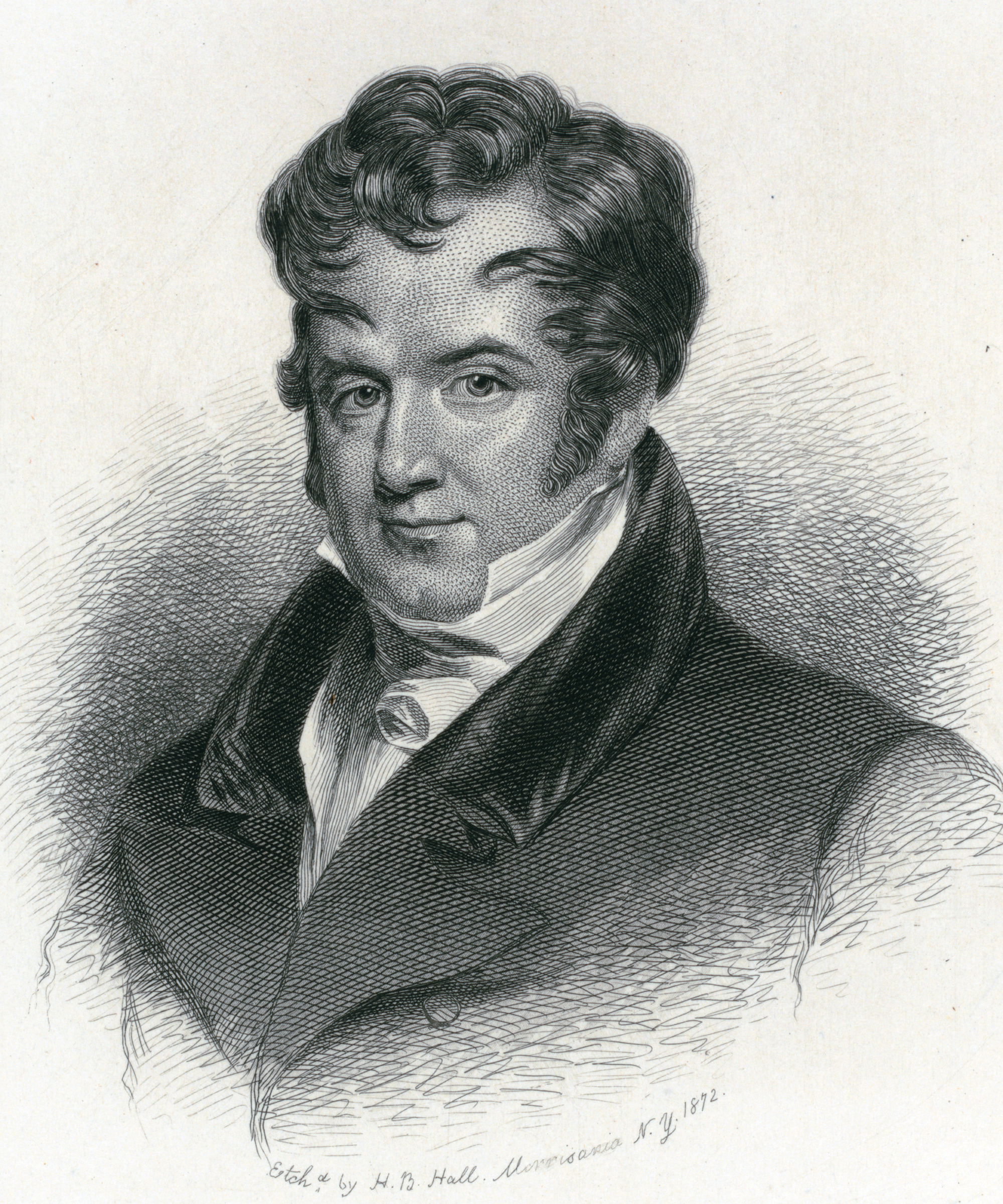
- Engraved portrait of Stephen Price, after a painting by Samuel William Reynolds
- Born: September 25, 1782; New York City
- Died: January 20, 1840 (aged 57); New York City
- Education: Columbia College (1799)
- Occupation: Theatre manager
- Spouses: Jane Barnewall (m. 1806–1835) Margaret Green (m. 1838)
- Parent(s): Michael Price; Helena Cornell

Stephen Price (September 25, 1782 — January 20, 1840) was a theatrical manager and impresario from New York City, United States who managed the Park Theatre in Manhattan, and Drury Lane in London, England.

== Early life and career ==
Stephen Price was born in New York City on September 25, 1782. He was the eldest son of Michael Price and Helena Cornwell, who also had one daughter and three younger sons who survived infancy.

Price's parents owned a farm in Red Bank, New Jersey, prior to the American Revolution. Michael Price sided with the Loyalists during the war, and when the British occupied New York City, he moved his family to the city and became a merchant.

In August 1783, Michael Price was indicted for his loyalty to the British crown, and the family fled to Shelburne, Nova Scotia. Unlike many other Loyalists who left the United States at the conclusion of the war, Michael Price returned with his family to New York, probably in early 1784, and was able to resume his career as a merchant, sending three of his sons to college, and setting up the youngest as a grocer.

Stephen Price graduated from Columbia College in 1799. In 1804, he became a lawyer, and practiced in New York City for four or five years before a change in career.

== Philip Hamilton and George Eacker ==
On November 20, 1801, Price accompanied Philip Hamilton (the oldest son of Alexander Hamilton) to a play at the Park Theatre, where a verbal confrontation with George Eacker took place. Although contemporary reports named Hamilton's companion only as "Mr. Price" or "young Mr. Prince" [sic], historians have identified that person with near-certainty as Stephen Price.

The encounter with Eacker culminated in challenges issued by Price and Hamilton, resulting in two separate duels with pistols in Weehawken, New Jersey. The first duel, between Price and Eacker, took place at noon on November 22, 1801 and resulted in no injuries though four shots were fired. Price and Eacker shook hands and reconciled, and Price was heard to remark that Eacker was "such a damned lath of a fellow that he might shoot all day to no purpose."

The second duel took place the next day, on November 23, 1801, when Philip Hamilton was shot and killed by Eacker.

== Theatrical career ==
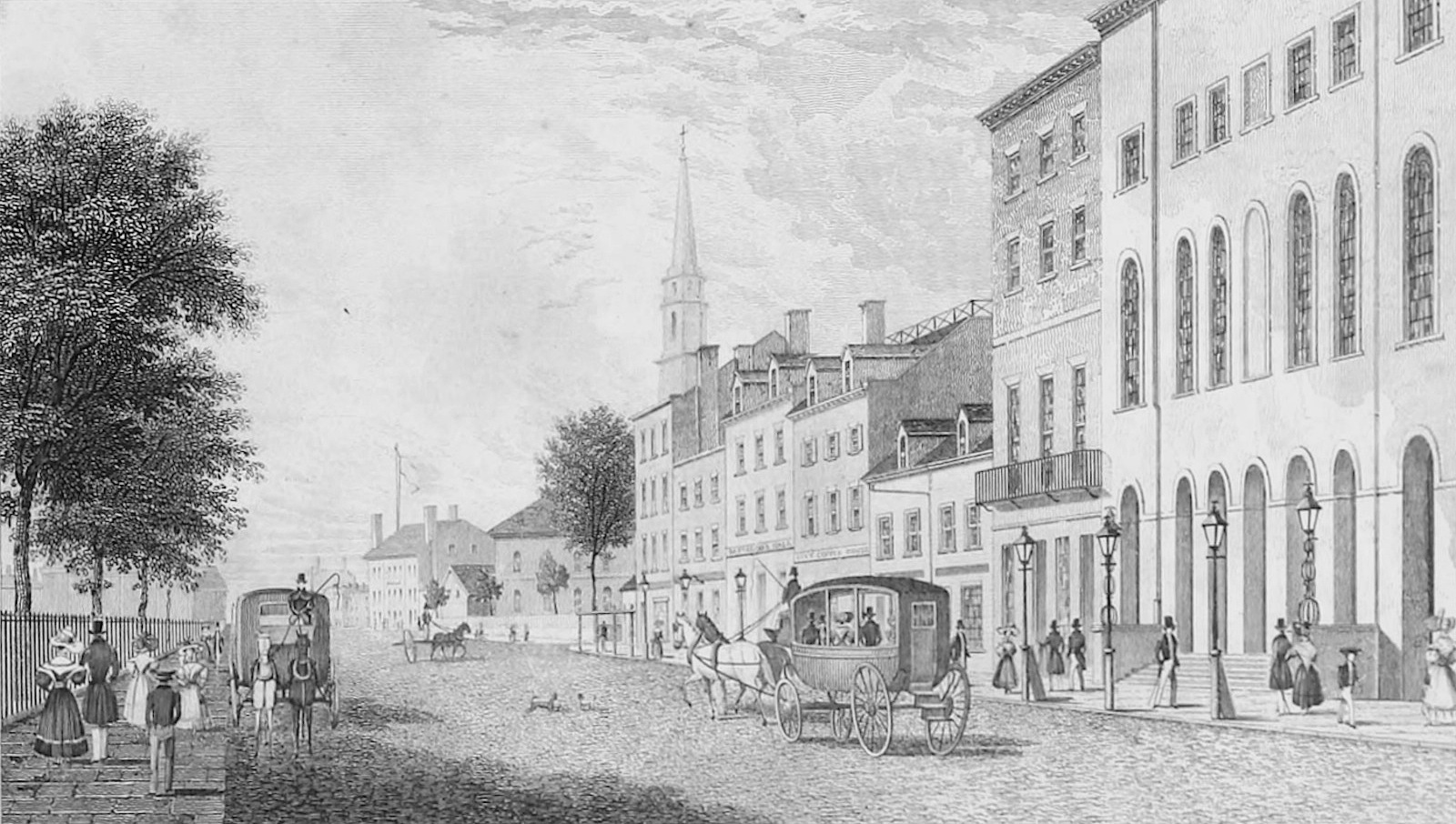
Park Theatre (at right), on Park Row in Manhattan, c. 1831

Price began purchasing shares in the Park Theatre in 1808, taking advantage of the theatre's financial difficulties to gradually attain a controlling interest. Upon taking over management of the theatre, Price became the first American theatre manager who was not also an actor or playwright, focusing solely on management.

He managed the Park Theatre for 31 years, during which time he initiated the decline of the theatrical resident company by bringing foreign celebrities to New York, leading to an emphasis on stars over a traditional stock company. Price began importing stars in 1810, beginning with George Frederick Cooke. He also began to abandon the practice of staging productions in repertory, and favored attracting audiences with visually spectacular shows.

Assisted by stage manager and operating manager Edmund Simpson, Price was able to keep the theatre open during the War of 1812, after which he traveled regularly to London in search of talented players such as Mary Greenhill Barnes, Clara Fisher, Edmund Kean, Charles Mathews, and Henry Wallack. After a fire in May 1820, the Park Theater was rebuilt, and reopened in September 1821.

From 1826 to 1830, Price left New York to manage the Theatre Royal, Drury Lane in London, securing for himself a steady supply and near-monopoly on English stage stars for American tours at the Park Theatre and venues in other cities, which he organized into a circuit.

The Park began to decline during the 1830s, and soon after Price resumed his personal management of the theatre, he fell ill and died on January 20, 1840.

== Family ==
Stephen Price was the oldest of four brothers and one sister. He and two of his younger brothers, Edward and William, attended Columbia College. William M. Price became a lawyer and politician who served as United States Attorney for the Southern District of New York from 1834 to 1838.

Price's youngest brother, Benjamin, became a grocer in Rhinebeck, New York. In May 1816, Benjamin was killed in a duel at Weehawken by a British army officer, who then returned to England. Several years later, Stephen Price learned that a different British officer, during a visit to New York, had boasted of being "instrumental" in goading his fellow officer into the 1816 duel. As a result, despite suffering from gout, Price promptly challenged the visiting officer and killed him in a duel at Bedloe's Island.
