= Chatham Garden Theatre =

Former theatre in Manhattan, New York

Coordinates: 40.713°N 74.003°W

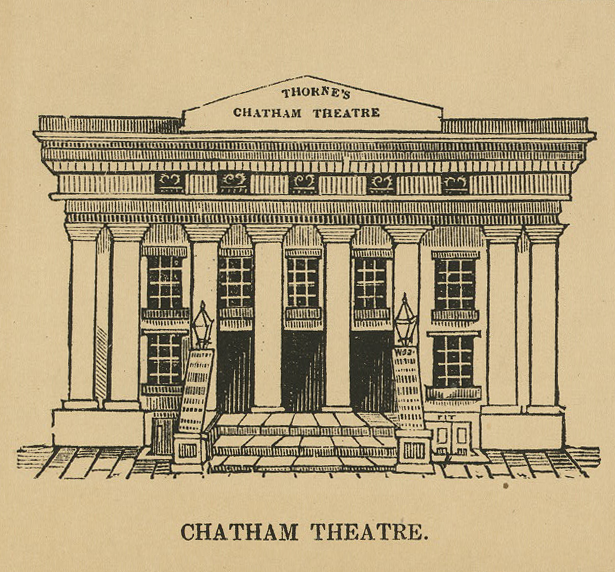
- The only known image of the Chatham Garden Theatre's exterior
- Interactive map of Chatham Garden Theatre
- Address: New York City; United States

Construction
- Opened: May 17, 1824
- Years active: 1824-1832
- Architect: George Conklin

The Chatham Garden Theatre or Chatham Theatre was a playhouse in the Chatham Gardens of New York City. It was located on the north side of Chatham Street on Park Row between Pearl and Duane streets in lower Manhattan. The grounds ran through to Augustus Street. The Chatham Garden Theatre was the first major competition to the high-class Park Theatre, though in its later years it sank to the bottom of New York's stratified theatrical order, below even the Bowery Theatre.

The Chatham Garden was converted to the Free Presbyterian Chatham Street Chapel in 1832.

== Creation and early seasons ==
The theatre began quite humbly. In 1823 Hippolite Barrière, the manager of the Chatham Gardens in New York City, erected a white, canvas tent in his public pleasure grounds. He dubbed it the Pavilion Theatre and began staging drama there with a ticket price of 25¢. The tent, which was used for other concerts and plays, also housed a saloon. The makeshift playhouse operated through the summer, perhaps the first such summer theatre in the United States.

Stephen Price, manager of New York's Park Theatre, tried to put a stop to Barrière's enterprise by reporting the tent to the authorities as a fire hazard. Barrière responded by erecting a brick-and-mortar structure on the site. The new building, named the Chatham Garden Theatre, opened on 17 May 1824 and played through the normal season.

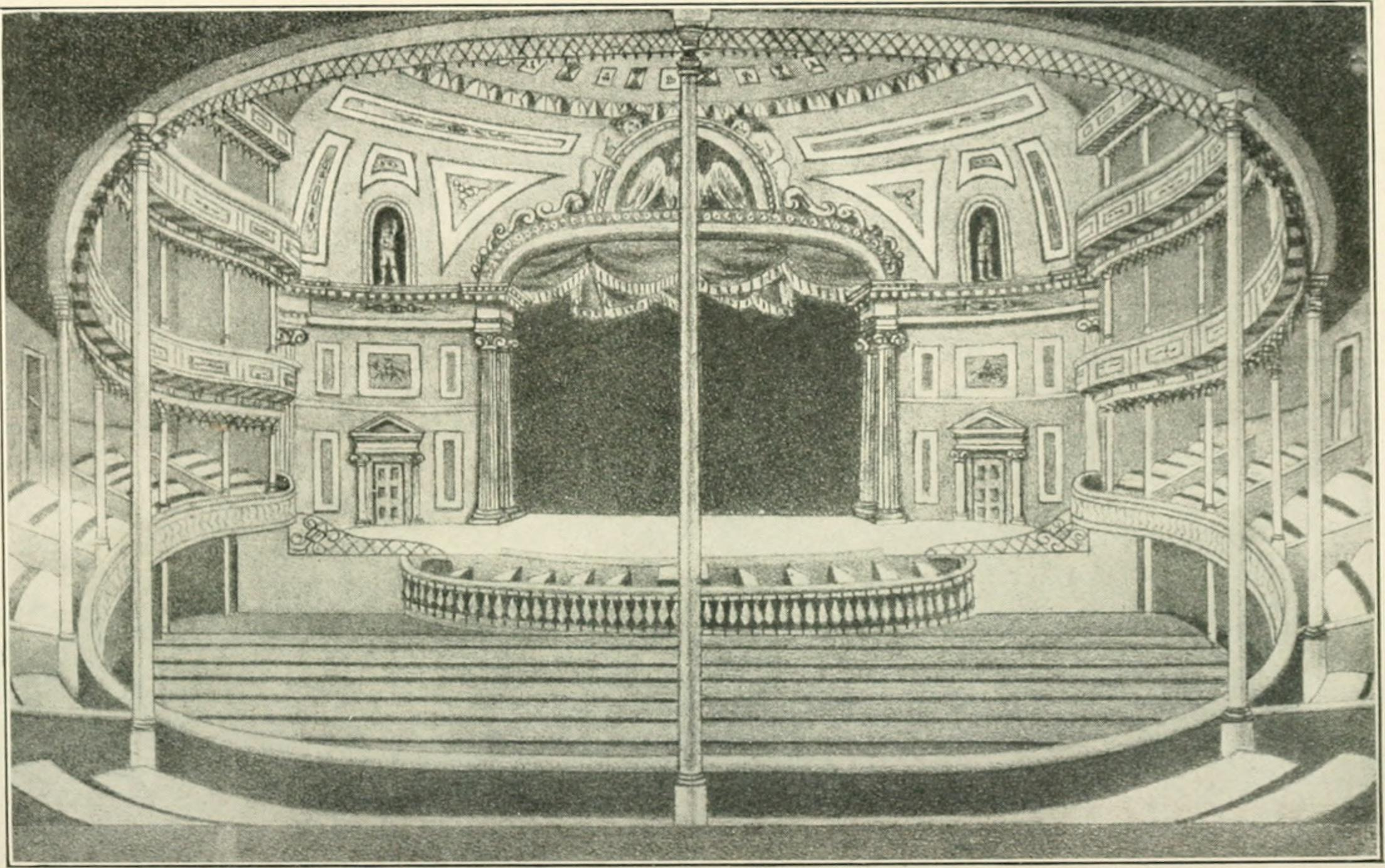
Chatham Garden Theatre interior, 1825

The theater was an ornate structure designed by architect George Conklin. It had no gallery, and it did not admit African Americans. The balcony was on the same level as the lobby and fronted the garden. The walls had slits and the doorways only blinds to facilitate airflow. Karl Bernhard, a visitor to New York in 1825–26, left this description:

. . . in Chatham [Garden] Theatre, situated at the extremity of a public garden, they performed the melo-drama of the Lady of the Lake tolerably well. I was much pleased with the inside of the theatre, and particularly with the decorations; it was full of people, and the heat extreme. Ladies of the first fashion do not go often to the theatre. In the pit persons pulled off their coats, in order to be cool.

However, the theatre's location was difficult to find. It was only accessible by passing through private buildings on the west side of Chatham Street. The New-York Mirror offered these instructions:

[T]he entrance to the theatre is through the hall of [a] dwelling house on Chatham Street. . . . [Y]ou proceed onward to the fountain, which throws up a refreshing column of pure water directly in front of the folding doors to the theatre. Passing through these doors you ascend, by a double flight of stairs (to the right and left) to the lobby of the first circle of boxes.

The Chatham Garden Theatre offered popular actors at reasonable prices, and it did well. The playhouse provided the first real competition for the upper-class Park Theatre in its second season, which began on 9 May 1825. It remained a classy establishment for the next three seasons. During this time, it produced the first two American operas, The Sawmill in 1824 and The Forest Rose in 1825.

== Later management ==
Barrière died on 21 February 1826. On 15 March, the Chatham Garden Theatre was sold at auction to Henry Wallack for $4,500. Wallack reopened it on 20 March for a four-month season. He then refurbished and redecorated the playhouse before reopening on 9 October 1826. However, Wallack went bankrupt, and he was forced to close the Chatham Garden Theatre in April 1827.

Later managers changed the theatre's focus from upper-class drama and opera to fare that appealed to the lower classes. A man named Megary took over as lessee and managed a short season beginning 16 June 1827 and another beginning on 3 December. Kilner and Maywood followed him, with a season beginning 9 June 1828.

In 1829, James H. Hackett took over and renamed the building the American Opera House. He offered two seasons of primarily light, popular music from 20 May 1829 to 1 September 1829. George Barrett and C. Young took over from him on 24 December, but their tenure lasted less than two weeks. The Opera House became Blanchard's Amphi-theatre on 18 January 1830, which specialized in equestrian entertainment and light drama. S. Phillips followed as manager on 11 March 1831; he lasted until May when Charles R. Thorne took the role. Finally, Thomas S. Hamblin purchased the theatre in late June 1831. The 1831–2 season was its last.

Since Barrière's death, the Chatham Garden had slipped to the low end of New York's entertainment industry. It was known for fistfights among its patrons, drunken brawls, and openness to prostitution. Of New York's three big theatres (the Park and the Bowery being the other two), it had the roughest reputation. Brothels thrived on the same block. Frances Trollope described the playhouse in no uncertain terms:

The Chatham is so utterly condemned by bon ton, that it requires some courage to decide upon going there; nor do I think my curiosity would have penetrated so far, had I not seen Miss Mitford's Rienzi advertised there. It was the first opportunity I had had of seeing it played, and in spite of very indifferent acting, I was delighted. The interest must have been great, for till the curtain fell, I saw not one quarter of the queer things around me; then I observed in the front row of a dress-box a lady performing the most maternal office possible, several gentlemen without their coats, and a general air of contempt for the decencies of life, certainly more than usually revolting.

Nevertheless, Mrs Trollope's description reveals that the theatre may not have been as raffish as its reputation made it sound. The presence of a nursing mother suggests that the theatre was lower-class, certainly, but also family-oriented.

== Presbyterian chapel ==
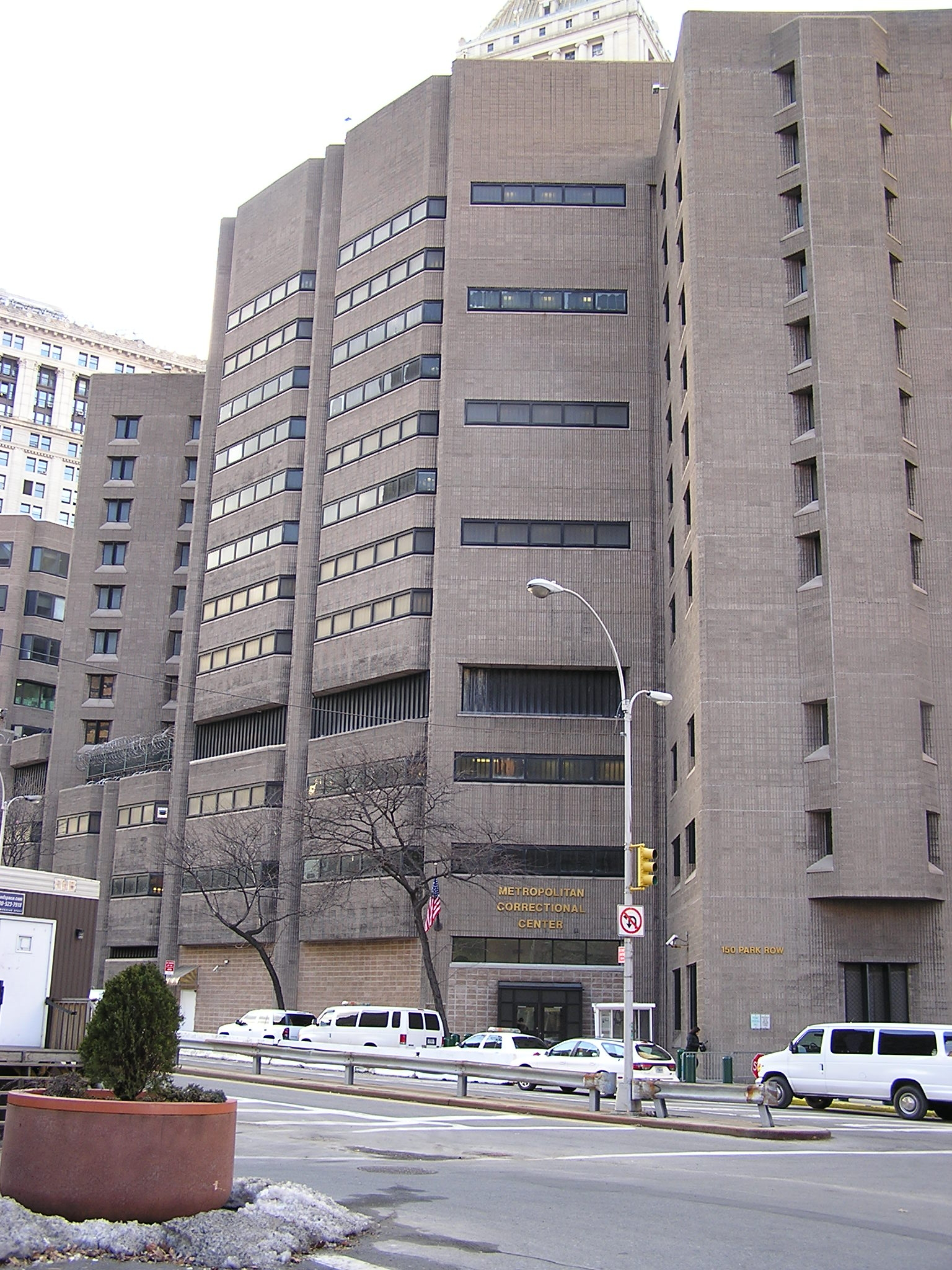
The federal prison facility currently located at 150 Park Row

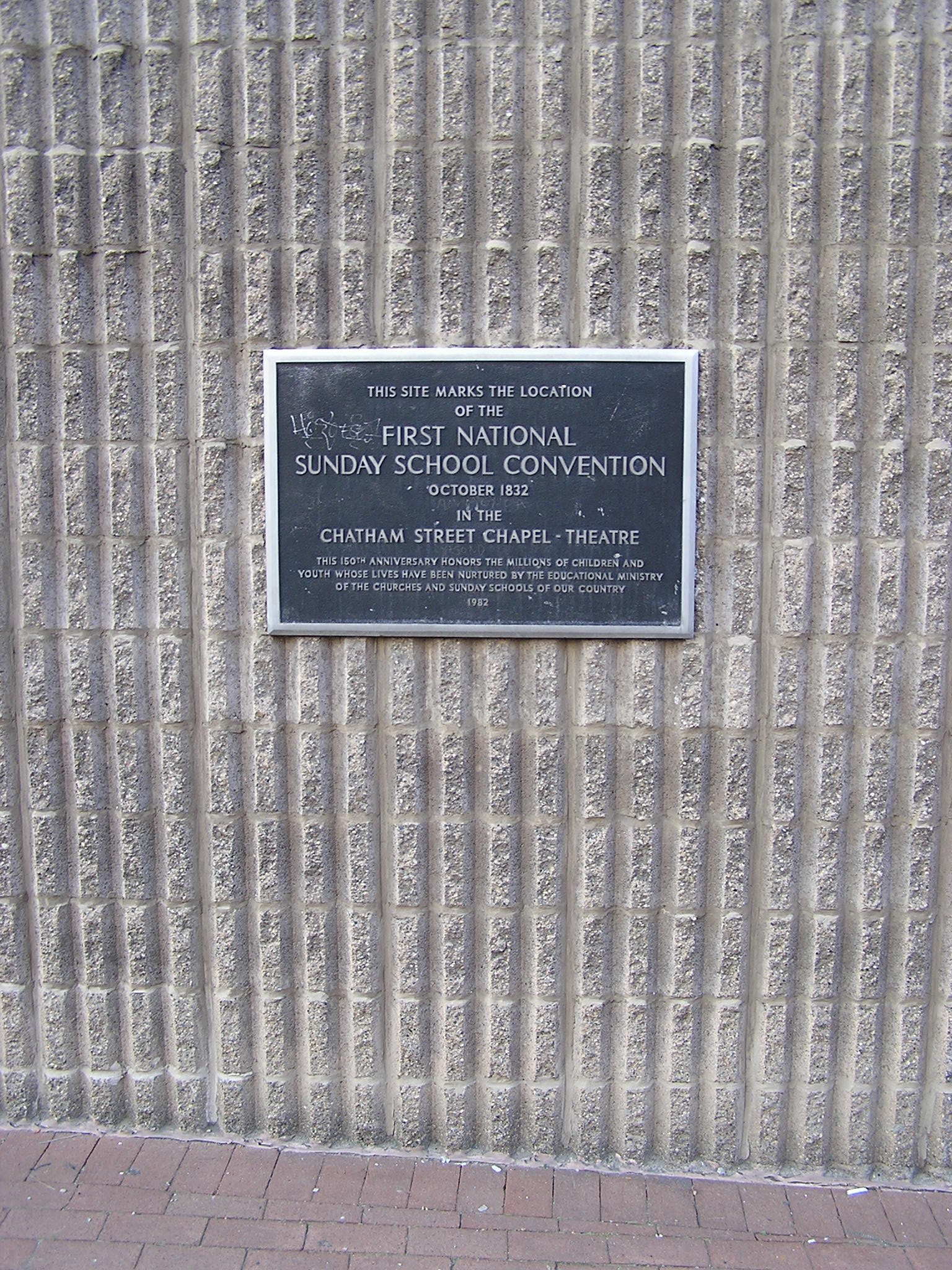
A historical plaque outside the prison

In the spring of 1832, Lewis Tappan and William Green rented the building. They offered it to the Presbyterian minister Charles Grandison Finney, a radical abolitionist who converted it into the Free Presbyterian Chatham Street Chapel. In October 1832, the chapel was the site of the first national Sunday School convention in the United States. Over the next ten years, at first here, then from 1835 to 1836 at the massive new Broadway Tabernacle, Finney gave sermons each Sunday to crowds as large as 3000 and led revivals three times a week. The Sacred Music Society, a popular religious choir, rented the building for two nights a week in this period at a cost of $850 a year. Philip Hone described his reaction to a performance in 1835:

[I was] astonished at the magnificence of the scene. The audience, of whom a large proportion were ladies, must have amounted to between 2000 and 3000 . . . . the chorus consisted of upwards of a hundred, the females all draped alike in white and arranged on opposite sides of the music gallery, formed an interesting and beautiful coup d'oeil. The ground floor, which is very capacious, and two large galleries were so crowded that I could scarcely find standing room behind the benches . . . .

In its later years, the church became a hotel. The building has since been demolished, and the land is now the site of a Metropolitan Correctional Center federal facility housing male and female pre-trial and holdover inmates, serving the Southern District of New York.
