= TGI =

TGI may refer to:

- Technical Group of Independents (1999–2001)
- TGI AG, the business of Helmut and Katarina Kaltenegger
- TGI Fridays, a restaurant chain
- Thermal grill illusion, a sensory illusion
- Tribunal de grande instance de Paris
- Triumph Group's NYSE ticker symbol
- Target Group Index, a subsidiary of market research company Kantar Group
