= Govindjee =

Indian-American biochemist (born 1932)

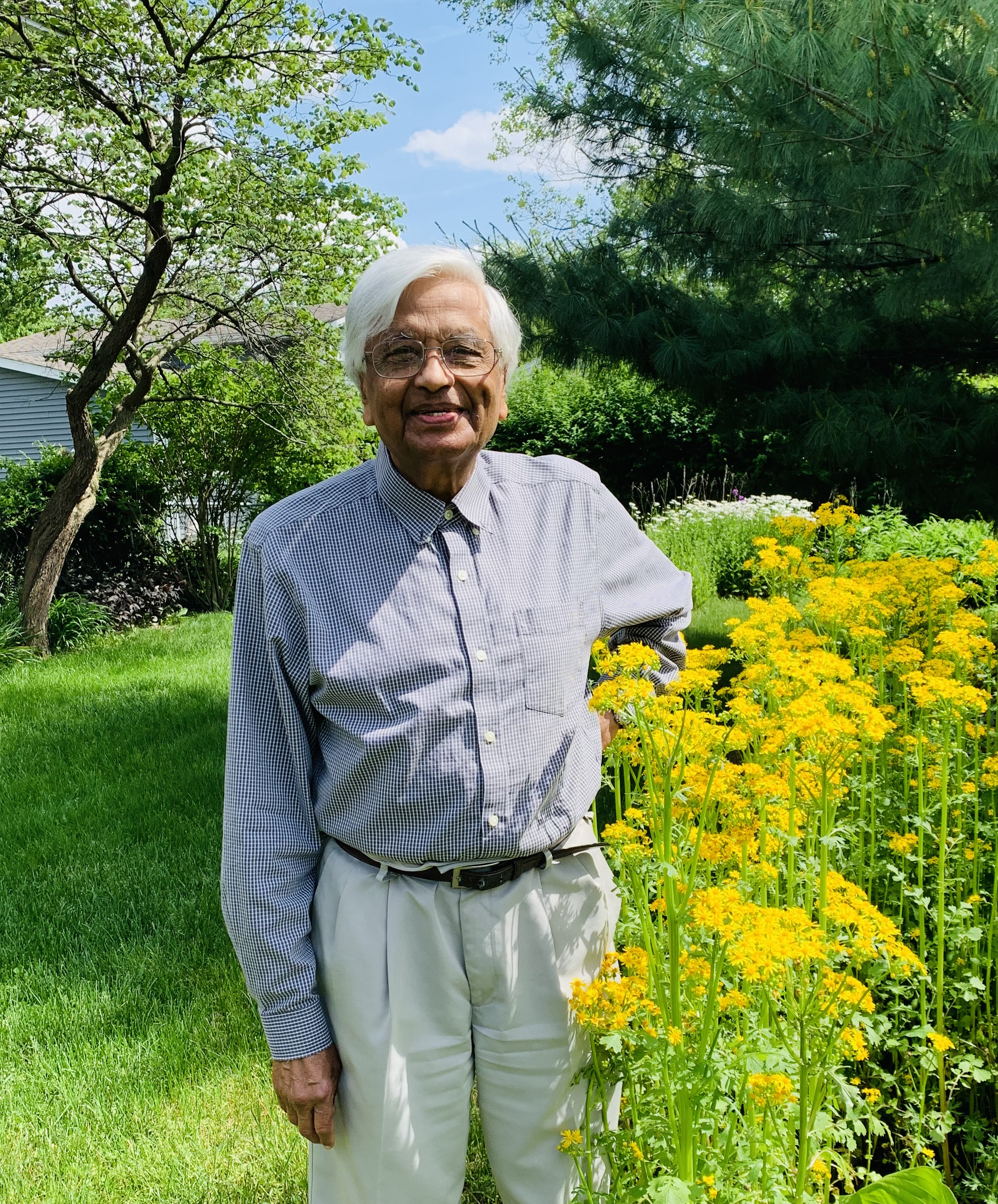
- Born: 24 October 1932 (age 94); Allahabad, India
- Education: University of Allahabad (B.Sc., M.Sc.); University of Illinois (Ph.D.)
- Occupations: Professor Emeritus of Biophysics, Biochemistry, and Plant Biology
- Employer(s): School of IB and MCB (prev. School of Life Sciences), University of Illinois at Urbana-Champaign
- Children: 2
- Website: www.life.illinois.edu/govindjee

Govindjee (born 24 October 1932) is an Indian-American scientist and educator. He is Professor Emeritus of Biochemistry, Biophysics and Plant Biology at the University of Illinois at Urbana-Champaign, where he taught from 1961 until 1999. As Professor Emeritus since 1999, Govindjee has continued to be active in the field of photosynthesis through teaching and publishing. He is recognized internationally as a leading expert on photosynthesis.

== Early life and education ==
Govindjee was born in Allahabad, India. He is known only by a single name, as his family by tradition did not use a surname.

At University of Allahabad, he received his B.Sc. in 1952 and his M.Sc. in 1954. He studied at University of Illinois at Urbana-Champaign, earning his Ph.D. in 1960. He began his PhD work with Robert Emerson who discovered the Emerson effect. After Emerson died in a plane crash, Govindjee completed his PhD work in biophysics with Eugene Rabinowitch. He has written about both Emerson and Rabinowitch.

== Career ==
Govindjee has made pioneering contributions to the field of photosynthesis—focusing on the function of Photosystem II. He showed, in 1960, the role of Chlorophyll a in Photosystem II; pioneered the first picosecond measurements on Photosystem I in 1978 at the University of Illinois at Urbana-Champaign, and then on Photosystem II in 1989 with Michael Wasielewski at Argonne National Laboratory. He is best known for establishing the unique role of bicarbonate in electron and proton transport in Photosystem II. Govindjee has not only provided the first comprehensive theory of thermoluminescence in algae and plants, but has shown how prompt and delayed fluorescence of Chlorophyll a can be used as a signature of various reactions in photosynthesis.

He is the founding Series Editor of the Advances in Photosynthesis and Respiration as well as the Editor of Historical Corner of Photosynthesis Research. He has written extensively on the topic of Photosynthesis, including on the role of chlorophyll in Photosynthesis, light absorption, excitation energy transfer, and how plants make oxygen.

== Honors and awards ==
Govindjee is the recipient of several awards and honors.

He was elected as a Fellow of the American Association for the Advancement of Science (AAAS) in 1976. In 1979, he was elected a Fellow and Life Member of the National Academy of Sciences, India. In 1981, he was elected President of the American Society for Photobiology.

He was the first recipient of the Lifetime Achievement award from the Rebeiz Foundation for Basic Research, the 2007 Communication Award of the International Society of Photosynthesis Research, and the 2008 Alumni Achievement Award from the University of Illinois at Urbana-Champaign.

In 2013, in honor of his 80th birthday, a tribute to Govindjee's life's work in photosynthesis appeared in Photosynthesis Research.

In 2016, he received the Dr. B.M. Johri Memorial award of the Society for Plant Research, India.

In 2018, Govindjee was elected as the Pravasi (Foreign) Fellow of the National Academy of Agricultural Sciences, India, and in honor of his 85th birthday, a special issue of Photosynthetica was released.

In 2019, the University of Illinois at Urbana-Champaign published an article on his research in photosynthesis and his "Photosynthesis Museum".

In 2020, Govindjee's innovative research and historical contributions, during 1999–2020, were highlighted, with messages and references to his work, from around the world.

== Personal life ==
Govindjee and his wife, Rajni, came to the US separately in the mid-1950s and earned Ph.D. degrees at the University of Illinois at Urbana-Champaign, studying under the same mentors.
