= Giral =

Giral is a surname. Notable people with the surname include:

- Jean Giral (1700–1787), French architect from Montpellier
- José Giral (1879–1962), Spanish politician during the Second Spanish Republic
- Sergio Giral (1937–2024), Black Cuban-American film writer and director

== Origin ==
This surname originated from the German and French pre 7th century language. It derives from either of the popular personal names Gerard or Gerald. "Gerard" comprises the elements "gari" meaning a spear, and "hard" - brave, whilst "Gerald" has the same prefix of "gari", but the suffix is from "wald", meaning to rule.This type of compound name is typical of the period in history known as "The dark ages".

== See also ==
- El Giral, town in the Colón province of Panama
- Stade Aimé Giral, multi-purpose stadium in Perpignan, France
- Giralt (surname)
