= John Haven Emerson =

American inventor (1906–1997)

John Haven Emerson (February 5, 1906 – February 4, 1997) was an American inventor of biomedical devices who specialized in respiratory equipment. He is best known for his work on improving the iron lung.

== Early life ==
John Haven Emerson was born on February 5, 1906, in New York City, the son of Haven Emerson, a physician, and Grace Parrish Emerson, the sister of Maxfield Parrish. He was named for his paternal grandfather, also John Haven Emerson (1840–1913), who was also a medical doctor.

== Career ==
=== Early career ===
At the age of 22, he bought a rudimentary machine shop from the estate of a local inventor. He moved the equipment to a small warehouse in Harvard Square, in Cambridge, Massachusetts, where he built research apparatus for professors and researchers of Boston-area medical schools, and produced many inventions over the following years. In 1928, he designed a Barcroft–Warburg apparatus for tissue respiration studies. In 1930, he designed a new type of micromanipulator, which was valuable in early physiology studies and later saw use in assembly of electronic components. In 1931, Emerson developed an oxygen tent which incorporated an improved cooling system.

=== Work on the iron lung ===
Emerson's father encouraged him to work on an artificial respirator after noticing the beginning of a polio epidemic. Emerson thus began his work on the iron lung in the early 1930s, improving the design of Philip Drinker, the co-inventor of the first widely used iron lung. Completed in July 1931, Emerson's lung was quieter, lighter, more efficient, and cheaper. At $1,000, it sold for less than half the price of Drinker's. Drinker threatened legal action against Emerson and later filed a lawsuit. However, Drinker not only lost the suit but also had his patent invalidated, as Emerson was able to use Torsten Thunberg's "barospirator" as prior art.

Emerson's new design replaced blowers and valves with a flexible diaphragm in a dual layer. This acted as a failsafe: if one layer was torn, the second would continue operation. He also made improvements to the chamber. The first example of this design, nicknamed "Old Number One", is currently on display at the Smithsonian Institution in Washington, DC. Emerson continued to make improvements to the iron lung, adding a quick opening and closing function, an improved pressure gauge, and emergency hand operation. His final improvement was the addition of a transparent positive pressure dome, allowing ventilation when the chamber was opened to care for the patient.

=== Later inventions ===
In the mid-1940s, following a suggestion of Dr. Alvin Barach, Emerson perfected the Thunberg barospirator, which caused respiration without moving the lungs at all. Emerson was involved with the development of high-altitude flight valves and SCUBA gear for the Navy shortly before World War II. In 1942, he developed an automatic resuscitator. In 1949 he developed a mechanical assistor for anesthesia with the cooperation of the anesthesia department at Harvard. In 1955, he built a pleural suction pump for postoperative thoracic surgery, the Emerson Postop Pump, which is still widely used. Late in the 20th century, he assisted Alvin Barach in developing the "In-Exsufflator Cough Machine", a device to aid in secretion removal in patients with neuromuscular disease.

== Personal life and death ==
John Haven Emerson was the brother of Robert Emerson, a botanist known for various discoveries, including the Emerson effect. John and Robert were great-grandsons of the brother of the philosopher Ralph Waldo Emerson. His uncle was the illustrator Maxfield Parrish. His first cousin was Bartram Kelley, also a nephew of Maxfield Parrish, who was a major designer of military helicopters for Bell Aircraft and Bell Helicopter.

John Haven Emerson died on February 4, 1997.
