= George Henry Yewell =

American painter

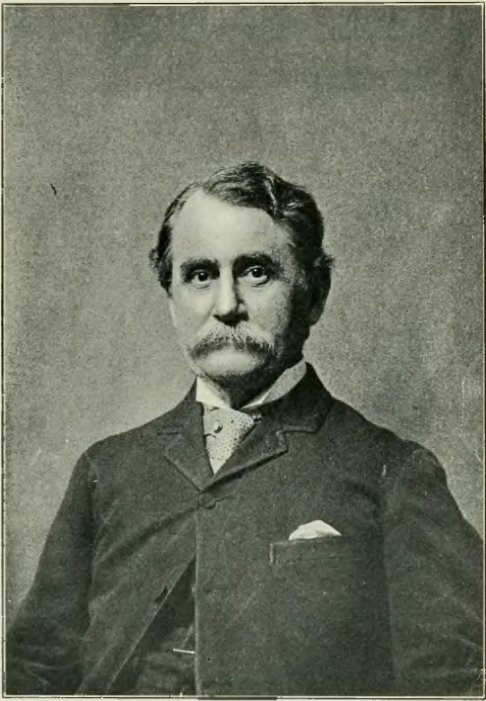
- Portrait of George Henry Yewell
- Born: 20 January 1830; Havre de Grace, Maryland
- Died: 26 September 1923 (aged 93)
- Education: Theodore S. Parvin; Thomas Hicks, New York
- Known for: Painter and etcher
- Movement: Orientalist
- Spouse(s): (1) Mary Elizabeth Coast (m. 1863); (2) Louise Const Yewell

George Henry Yewell (20 January 1830 – 26 September 1923) was an American painter and etcher.

== Early years ==
Yewell was born in Havre de Grace, Maryland. His father died when he was a boy, and he and his mother left Maryland for Cincinnati, as she had family there; in that city he received some instruction from Theodore S. Parvin, who later became a prominent educator in Iowa. In 1841, mother and son moved again to Iowa City, Iowa, where other members of their extended family lived. In 1848, Yewell apprenticed himself to a tailor to learn a trade, but at that same time he began showing an interest in art; a formative experience early in life was his encounter with a suite of prints based upon the cycle The Voyage of Life by Thomas Cole. His breakthrough came with a political cartoon he drew about the controversy surrounding the move of the state capital from Iowa City to Des Moines. He later described the incident:

At the height of the excitement, I drew a large caricature, representing the Capitol building on wheels, and oxen pulling one way, upon whose shoulders were placed heads of members who voted for removal. On the other end of the building were those members who voted against the bill, represented by oxen whose feeble chain had broken and tumbled them in a heap. Principal leaders of the movement were represented as drivers; bodies of different animals, suited to their different characters, being in place of their own. The likenesses were easily recognized and the caricature created a sensation. It went from town to town over the state and made me widely known.

Among those who took notice of the young artist was Charles Mason, Chief Justice of the Iowa Supreme Court. He collected a group of associates and together they financed the young man's move to New York City for the formal study of art. Charles Anderson Dana provided him with a letter of introduction to Thomas Hicks, whose pupil he became, and in whose studio he met William Makepeace Thackeray. He then enrolled in the school of the National Academy of Design, which he attended from 1851 until 1853.

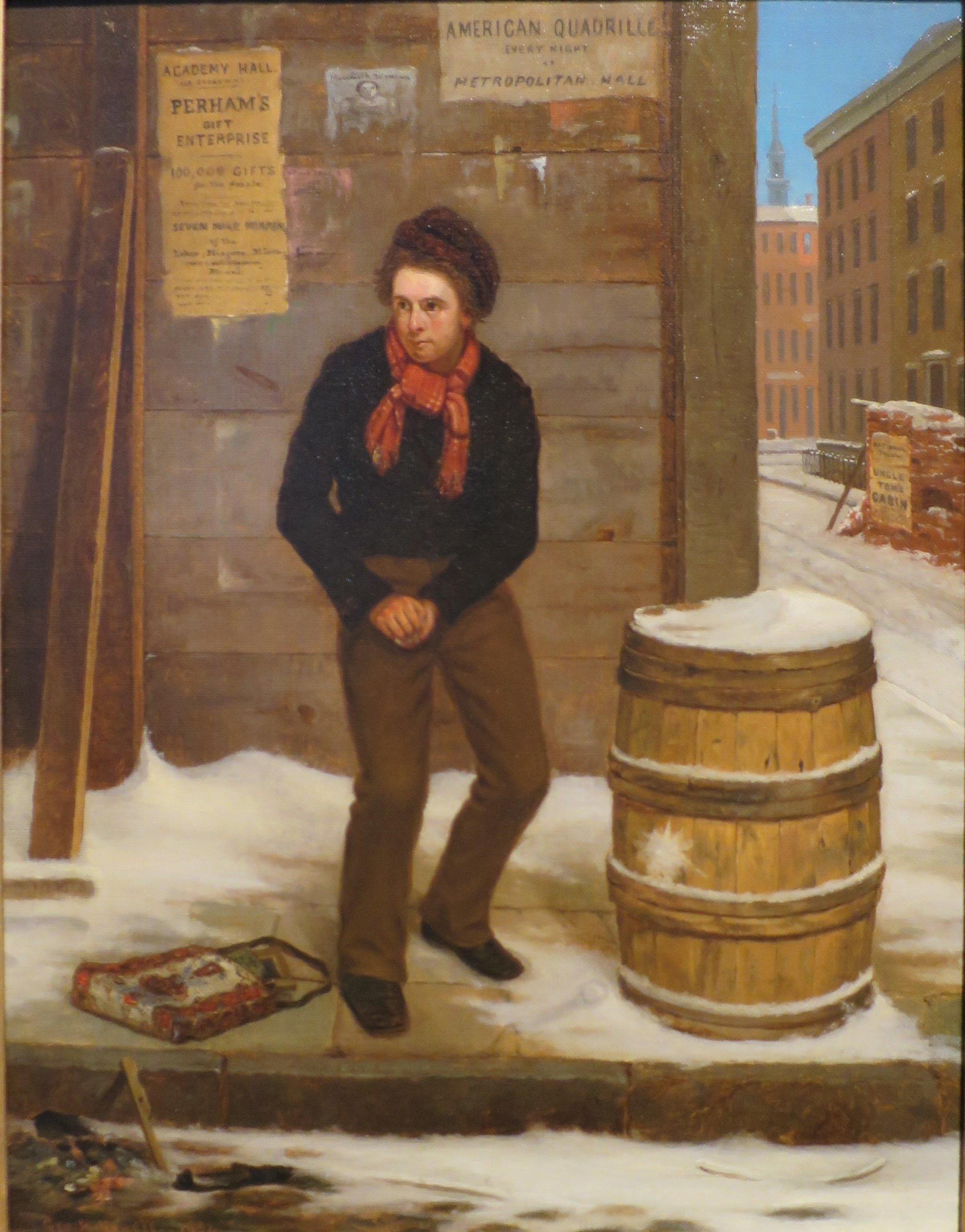
Self-Defense, oil on canvas, 1854, in the collection of the High Museum of Art

== Career ==
After his period of study, Yewell returned to Iowa City and painted portraits, specializing in depictions of children. By January 1856 he was back in New York and re-enrolled at the academy; he took a studio in the city at this time as well. That July he went to Paris, again supported by Mason and his friends; until 1861 he studied there with Thomas Couture and counting among his acquaintances fellow students Henry A. Loop and Thomas Satterwhite Noble. A copy which he made of a painting by Rosa Bonheur during this time won him much acclaim from his fellow artists. In 1862 Yewell was in Iowa again, taking studio space in Des Moines, but by that spring he was back in New York, with a studio in the Dodsworth Building, when he submitted five works to the annual exhibition of the National Academy. At least three of the pieces in question were genre scenes dating to his French sojourn. Yewell never returned to Iowa to live, though he visited regularly, and married a local woman, Mary Elizabeth (Mollie) Coast, in 1863. With his wife and her brother Oscar he returned to Europe in 1867, and took up residence in Rome; he spent summers in Perugia and Venice and traveled to Egypt in 1875, and returned to the United States in 1878. Among his friends in Rome were Elihu Vedder, Charles C. Coleman, and Bayard Taylor. It is suspected that Yewell returned to the United States due to the behavior of his wife, who had shocked the American expatriate community in Rome; the couple were divorced the next year, and she married the English painter Edwin Ellis.

Yewell maintained deep ties with his patrons from Iowa, and earned many portrait commissions from them; even so, upon his return to America settled in New York City, where the chances of finding work were better. He rented a studio in the Tenth Street Studio Building, which he kept at least until 1880. He returned there after taking space elsewhere in the city, coming back around 1895 and remaining there for the rest of his life. He worked mainly as a portraitist, but also created paintings from sketches he had made during his international travels. In 1881 he was reported to be designing a frieze for the Veterans Room in the Seventh Regiment Armory on Park Avenue, a task he undertook for Louis Comfort Tiffany. Yewell spent his summers in Lake George. Elected an Associate of the National Academy of Design in 1862, and made a full member in 1880, he contributed to exhibitions there beginning in 1852; apart from 1872 to 1876 his works were rarely absent from the yearly shows. He seems to have wished to be known as a genre painter, as he sent few portraits until the 1880s. Later he submitted depictions of the interiors of European buildings, especially churches. He continued showing at the academy until 1916. Yewell died in New York, and was remembered with a lengthy tribute entered into the minutes of the Academy Council, a practice which had ceased some time before. At his death he was the academy's oldest living member. He also occupied a number of positions within New York society; he was a Patron of the Metropolitan Museum of Art, a member of the Century Club, and for many years secretary of the Artists' Fund Society of the City of New York.

== Collections of his work ==
Throughout his career Yewell depicted many prominent Iowans, including governors Samuel J. Kirkwood, Ralph P. Lowe, and John Chambers, General Grenville M. Dodge, and justices Charles Mason, George G. Wright, and John Forrest Dillon. His drawings of Iowa City are likely the earliest records of that town's appearance. A self-portrait is in the collection of the National Academy of Design, as is a view of the interior of Saint Mark's, Venice, while thirty-six paintings are owned by the University of Iowa and nine are in the collection of the Iowa Historical Society. Other museums which own examples of his work include the High Museum of Art, the St. Johnsbury Athenaeum, the Milwaukee Art Museum, and the Metropolitan Museum of Art. Yewell's papers are currently held by the University of Iowa. Among them are his notebooks, many of which he copied from his earlier journals, which he kept sporadically throughout his career and which provide valuable insight not only into his creative life but into the everyday affairs of the period. The archive also contains a collection of his etchings and drawings; sketchbooks; prints made from his paintings; photographs; and much correspondence from throughout his career.
