= Moschcowitz =

Moschcowitz is a surname. Notable people with the name include:

- Alexis Moschcowitz (1865−1933), American surgeon
- Eli Moschcowitz (1879–1964), American doctor

== See also ==
- Moskowitz
- Thrombotic thrombocytopenic purpura, also known as Moschcowitz syndrome
