= Allan McLane Hamilton =

American psychiatrist (1848–1919)

Allan McLane Hamilton FRSE
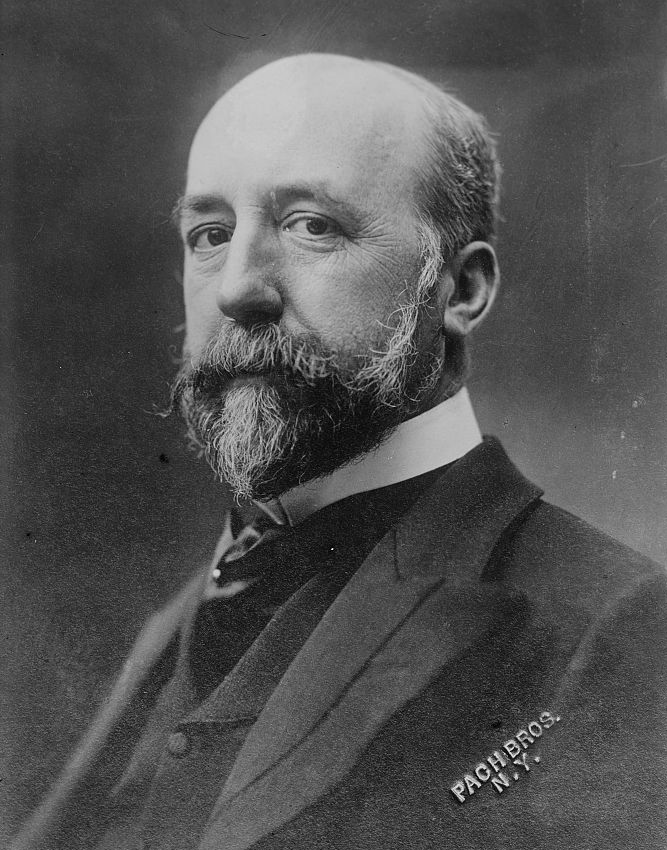
- Hamilton, c. 1919
- Born: October 6, 1848; Brooklyn, New York, U.S.
- Died: November 23, 1919 (aged 71); Great Barrington, Massachusetts, U.S.
- Resting place: Poughkeepsie Rural Cemetery
- Education: Columbia University (MD)
- Occupation: Psychiatrist
- Spouses: Florence Rutgers Craig (m. 1874; div. 1902) May Copeland Tomlinson (m. 1902)
- Parent(s): Philip Hamilton; Rebecca McLane
- Family: Hamilton; Schuyler

Allan McLane Hamilton FRSE (October 6, 1848 – November 23, 1919) was an American psychiatrist, specializing in suicide and the impact of accidents and trauma upon mental health, and in criminal insanity, appearing at several trials.

He was a founder of the New York Psychiatrical Society. He was a Professor of Psychiatry at Cornell Medical College in New York. He was the grandson of Louis McLane on his mother's side and Alexander Hamilton on his father's side, and in 1910, he wrote The Intimate Life of Alexander Hamilton, a biography of his grandfather.

== Early life and family ==
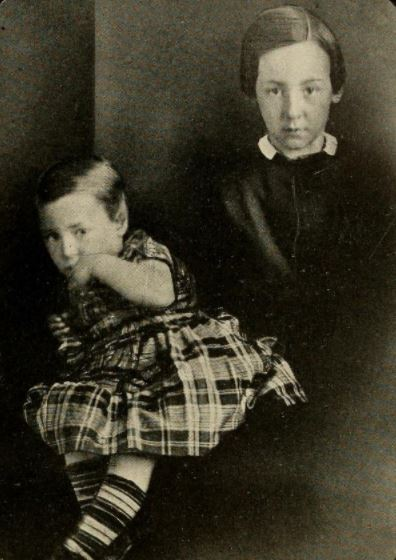
Hamilton and his older brother Louis, 1851

Hamilton was born in Brooklyn in New York on October 6, 1848, the son of Philip Hamilton (1802–1884) and his wife, Rebecca McLane (1813–1893). His paternal grandfather was an American founding father, Alexander Hamilton.

His maternal grandfather, Louis McLane (1786–1857), was a member of the U.S. House, the U.S. Senate, the 10th Secretary of the Treasury, the 12th Secretary of State, and a two time U.S. Minister to the United Kingdom. His mother's younger brother was Robert Milligan McLane (1815–1898), a Governor of Maryland and U.S. Ambassador to Mexico, France, and China.

As a boy and later on, Hamilton ate Christmas dinners at the old-fashioned English home of David Colden (1733–1784), a son of Lt. Gov. Cadwallader Colden. He also ate Thanksgiving dinner every year with Charlotte Augusta Gibbes Astor (1825–1887), the wife of John Jacob Astor III and mother of Willie Astor (1848–1919), a friend of his who later moved abroad due to constant ridicule in the press and became an English peer.

As a young teenager during the American Civil War, Hamilton took part from 1861 until 1863 in "repeated drillings, and marchings in the Rochester Home Guards, a sort of Boy Scout organisation."

Hamilton's older brother, Captain Louis McLane Hamilton, enlisted as a volunteer in the 22nd New York Militia in 1862 and fought at the Battle of Gettysburg as part of the 3rd U.S. Infantry. After the war, he served in the 7th U.S. Cavalry under General George Armstrong Custer. Louis was killed while leading his command during Custer's 1868 attack on Black Kettle's Cheyenne encampment in the Battle of Washita River.

== Career ==
=== Early medical practice ===
Hamilton received his medical education at the College of Physicians and Surgeons at Columbia University, graduating in 1870. The subject of his thesis was galvanopuncture, the application of electric current to needles inserted in the body. He was the recipient of the highest faculty prize and the Harsen Prize medal upon his graduation.

Specializing in "nervous diseases", Hamilton was one of the first medical practitioners in America to use electricity for cauterization; his text on Clinical Electro-Therapeutics was published in 1873. Hamilton also invented an improved dynamometer, which he described in an April 1874 article in the Psychological Journal and Medico-Legal Journal.

During the 1870s, Hamilton wrote numerous articles for medical journals on subjects including epilepsy and tremors, and was editor of the American Psychological Journal. He lectured on nervous diseases at the Long Island College Hospital. He was physician in charge of the New York State Hospital for Diseases of the Nervous System, and served as a visiting surgeon to an epileptic and paralytic hospital on Blackwell's Island. In 1879, he won the highest prize given by the American Medical Association.

During his early years of practice, he was the doctor to much of the old New York society that lived about Washington Square, lower Fifth Avenue and St. John's Park. In his autobiography, Hamilton wrote that "New York society of the best kind was exclusive and conservative, and something besides money was then required to get a foothold in its midst." In the early 1870s, he associated socially with the De Peyster, Livingston, Van Rensselaer, Schuyler, De Rham, Wilkes, Delano, Forbes, Schermerhorn, Wetmore, Minturn, Grinnell, Winthrop, King, Duer, Swarthout, Duncan families, which like the Hamilton family were prominent in New York society. After the Civil War, however, Hamilton was witness to their gradual decline and thinning out, as they were overtaken in the forefront of society by so-called "new money" people who had earned their wealth, for example, in the Comstock Lode.

In the 1870s, Hamilton served as a member of the Coroner's jury in New York; in an 1874 inquest, he agreed with William A. Hammond that hydrophobia was a disease of the nerve centers and not a blood poison. In 1874, he presented a paper titled Suicide in Large Cities, with Reference to Certain Sanitary Conditions which tend to Prevent its Moral and Physical Causes at the Health Congress of the American Public Health Association in Philadelphia. In this paper, he argued that suicides were more strongly felt in metropolitan areas due to the use of intoxicating drinks or narcotics, nervous disease, seduction, immoral habits, and disappointment.

=== Public medical work ===
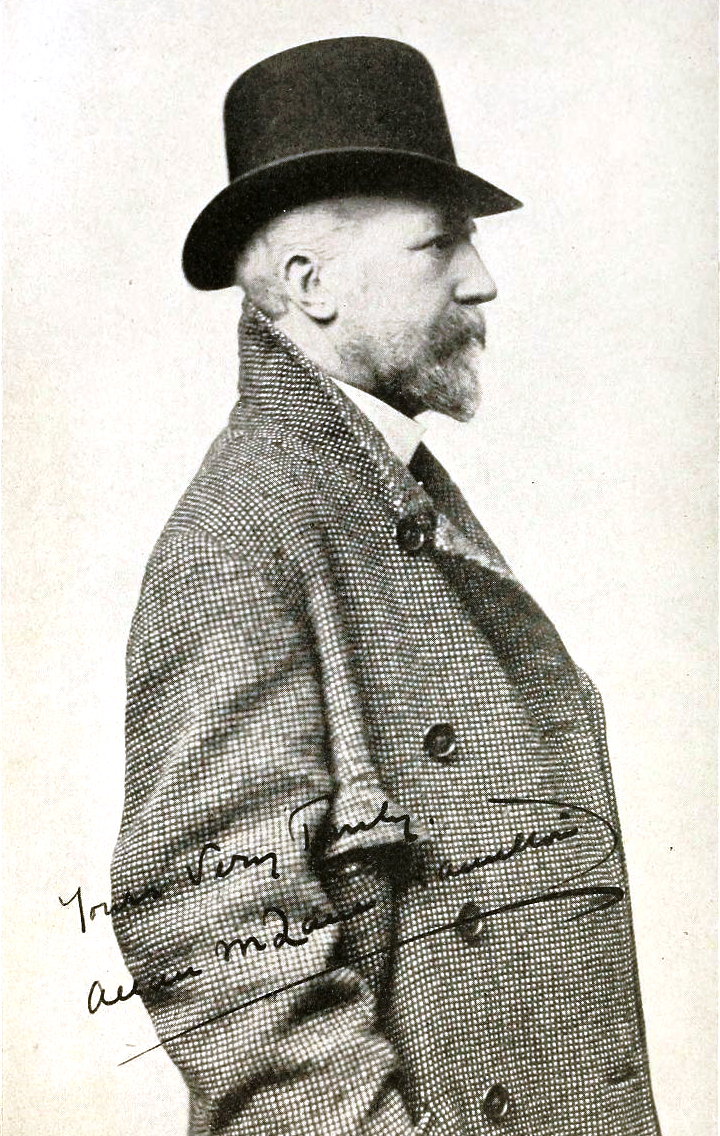
Allan McLane Hamilton, c. 1916

By the 1880s, Hamilton had become well known as an "alienist", an archaic term that was then used to describe a psychiatrist or psychologist. He was an early expert in what is now known as forensic psychology, including evaluating defendants to determine their competency to stand trial. From 1900 to 1903, Hamilton was a professor of mental diseases at Cornell University Medical College.

Hamilton was called as an expert witness in several of the most prominent cases of his time, including the murder trials of the assassins of presidents James A. Garfield and William McKinley:

- In 1881–1882, during the trial of Charles J. Guiteau for the assassination of President Garfield, Hamilton gave evidence on the subject of Guiteau's sanity. Hamilton always maintained that Guiteau was perfectly sane and a "shrewd scamp".
- In 1892, Hamilton provided evidence during the much publicized murder trial of Carlyle W. Harris, who had killed his wife, Mary Helen Potts.
- In 1901, Hamilton gave evidence during the trial of Leon Czolgosz, for the assassination of President William McKinley, who had been shot and killed during the 1901 Pan-American Exposition in Buffalo, New York. Hamilton was sent for by Ansley Wilcox, a distinguished Buffalo lawyer at whose home the President died. Contrary to Guiteau's case, Hamilton felt that Czolgosz did not receive an adequate defense and that indeed he was "a defective who had long been drifting to paranoia", and was likely influenced by the yellow journalism of the time, which had been vociferously attacking McKinley in the press.
- In 1906, he testified at the murder trial of Harry K. Thaw, who had murdered New York architect Stanford White, a friend of Hamilton's, in 1906.
- In 1907 Hamilton was asked by George Washington Glover II to evaluate his mother, Mary Baker Eddy, the founder of Christian Science, to determine whether she could manage her own affairs as part of a lawsuit called the "Next Friends suit". Hamilton met personally with Eddy to evaluate her and remained in occasional correspondence during the suit. Hamilton told The New York Times that the attacks on Eddy were the result of "a spirit of religious persecution that has at last quite overreached itself", and that "there seems to be a manifest injustice in taxing so excellent and capable an old lady as Mrs. Eddy with any form of insanity." Dr. Edward French, who was with Hamilton, agreed with his assessment, finding "not the least evidence of mental weakness or incompetency."

=== Honors ===
In the late 1890s, Hamilton appears to have visited Scotland, where in 1899 he was elected a Fellow of the Royal Society of Edinburgh. His proposers were Sir James Crichton-Browne, Sir Thomas Grainger Stewart, Sir John Batty Tuke and Sir James Dewar.

In 1912, he received an honorary LLD degree from Hamilton College on the centennial celebration of the college which was named after his grandfather.

== Personal life ==
=== Biography of Alexander Hamilton ===
In 1910, Hamilton wrote a biography of his paternal grandfather, Alexander Hamilton, titled The Intimate Life of Alexander Hamilton, which was published by Scribner & Sons. In 1911, he published an op-ed article in The New York Times protesting Gertrude Atherton's characterization of his grandfather in her novel, The Conqueror, as someone "whose life was dotted with questionable affairs and escapades with women."

=== Marriages and family life ===
Hamilton was married twice, first on May 25, 1874, to Florence Rutgers Craig (1854–1925), the daughter of William Pickney Craig and Hannah Sitgreaves (née Reeves) Craig (1815–1889), in Baltimore, Maryland.

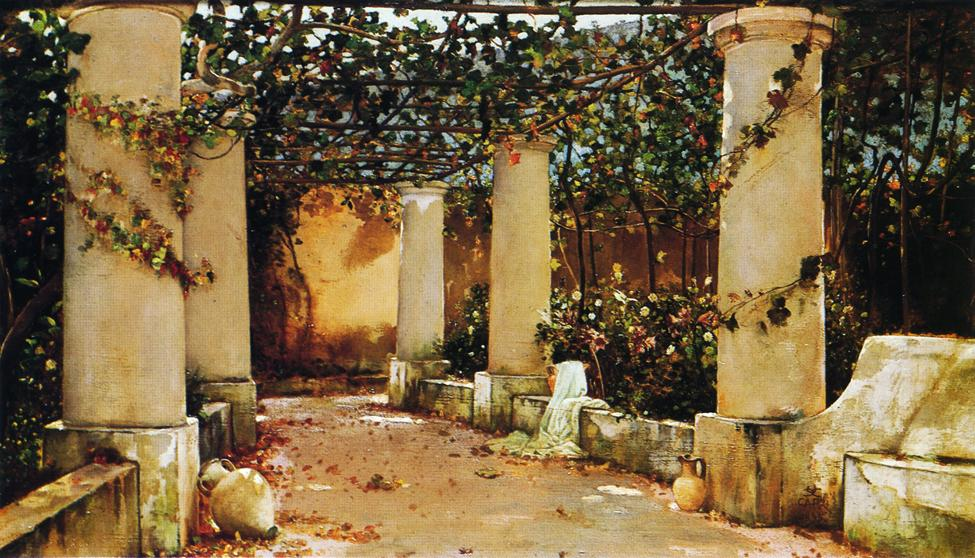
The Villa Castello, Capri, painted by Charles Caryl Coleman, 1895

In 1894, Hamilton visited the Island of Capri off the coast of Italy, and Villa Narcissus, the Capri home of his friend Charles Caryl Coleman, an artist. Coleman located a home for Hamilton on Capri, near his own, and Hamilton moved into the 800-year-old home and garden known as Villa Castello. While in Capri, Hamilton befriended Dr. Axel Munthe of Castello Barbarossa, Dr. Emil von Behring, and Dr. Ignazio Cerio. He became close there with Lord John Norton, with writers Norman Douglas, Marion Crawford, and Maxim Gorky, and with the painter George Bernard Butler (who had served with Hamilton's brother in the American Civil War).

After a formal separation from his wife Florence, Hamilton was living and working in London when he met May Copeland Tomlinson (1870–1924), whom he had seen as a patient. Tomlinson was a wealthy Englishwoman, born in London, who also had a summer home on Capri. On March 27, 1902, shortly after obtaining an official divorce in Sioux Falls, South Dakota, he married for the second time. May Copeland Tomlinson was an author of articles on George Eliot and a translator of Honoré de Balzac. She had also obtained a divorce in Sioux Falls from her former husband, Frederick Tomlinson, an architect. She had one daughter, Madeline Tomlinson, who was living in New York in 1910.

Hamilton's only child, Louis McLane Hamilton (1876–1911), named after Hamilton's late brother, was born to his first wife Florence. Louis was a lieutenant in the United States Army, and served in the Spanish–American War. He was twice court-martialed, once for using offensive language in front of another officer's wife, and the second time for being absent without leave and making a false report to his superior officer. In both cases, President Theodore Roosevelt intervened to commute the sentence, preventing Louis's dismissal from the Army. Louis died in Paris on August 29, 1911, after a long illness.

=== Death ===
Allan McLane Hamilton died on November 23, 1919, at his summer residence, Fair Meadows, in Great Barrington, Massachusetts, aged 71. He is buried in Poughkeepsie Rural Cemetery outside New York.

== Publications ==
- Clinical Electro-Therapeutics, Medical and Surgical: A Hand-Book for Physicians in the Treatment of Nervous and other Diseases (1873)
- Suicide in Large Cities (1875)
- Nervous Diseases; Their Description and Treatment (1878)
- Types of Insanity: An Illustrated Guide in the Physical Diagnosis of Mental Disease (1883)
- Mental Jurisprudence (1883)
- A System of Legal Medicine (1894)
- Railway and Other Accidents with Relation to Injury and Disease of the Nervous System: A Book for Court Use (1904)
- The Drum (1910) (a poetry collection)
- The Intimate Life of Alexander Hamilton (1910)
- Recollections of an Alienist: Personal and Professional (1916)
