= Haven Emerson =

American physician (1875–1957)

- Born: October 19, 1874; New York City, New York, U.S.
- Died: May 21, 1957 (aged 82); Greenport, New York, U.S.
- Education: Harvard University; Columbia University
- Occupations: Physician; Health Commissioner of New York City
- Spouse: Grace Parrish (m. 1901)
- Children: 5, including Robert and John
- Medical career
- Field: Public health; epidemiology
- Institutions: Columbia University College of Physicians and Surgeons; Columbia University Mailman School of Public Health; New York City Department of Health and Mental Hygiene; American Public Health Association
- Awards: Harsen Prize (1901); Sedgwick Memorial Medal (1935); Lasker Award (1949)

Haven Emerson (October 19, 1874 – May 21, 1957) was an American physician who served as Commissioner of Health of the City of New York. He is known for his contributions to public health and epidemiology.

== Early life and education ==
Haven Emerson was born in New York City on October 19, 1874, the son of John Haven Emerson (1840–1913), one of the city's first public health physicians. The younger Emerson was educated at Harvard University and graduated from the Columbia University College of Physicians and Surgeons (P&S) in 1899. After completing a residency at Bellevue Hospital, he served for several years as an associate in physiology and medicine at P&S.

== Career ==
Haven Emerson is best remembered for his contributions to public health and epidemiology. He was appointed Deputy Commissioner in the New York City Health Department in 1914. The following year, he took over as Commissioner of Health of the City of New York. In later years, Emerson was a longtime member on the New York City Board of Health.

In 1917, as the United States was entering World War I, Emerson enlisted in the United States Army at the rank of major. Surgeon General of the Army William C. Gorgas appointed him Chief Epidemiologist to the American Expeditionary Forces (AEF) in Tours, France. In this role, Emerson coordinated communicable disease reporting for the AEF throughout England, France, Italy, and eventually Russia.

After demobilization, Emerson became the first Director of Columbia's DeLamar Institute of Public Health. Among his many other contributions to the field of public health, Emerson conducted health surveys of numerous American cities, spearheaded development of a standardized disease nomenclature, and participated in the Health Section of the League of Nations.. In the 1930s and 1940s, he led studies of hospital services and administration and is recognized for co-establishing the Hospital Council of Greater New York in 1938. Haven was president of the American Public Health Association in 1933–1934.

== Personal life and death ==
Haven Emerson married Grace Parrish, the sister of Maxfield Parrish, in 1901, and they had five children, including Robert in 1903 and John in 1906. Robert Emerson was a botanist known for various discoveries, including the Emerson effect. John Haven Emerson was an inventor of biomedical devices best known for making significant improvements to the iron lung. Haven Emerson was a grandson of the brother of the philosopher Ralph Waldo Emerson.

He died in a hospital in Greenport, Suffolk County, New York, on May 21, 1957, after suffering from an illness.

== Awards ==
He received the Harsen Prize in 1901 from P&S. The American Public Health Association awarded him the Sedgwick Memorial Medal in 1935 and the Lasker Award in 1949 "for extraordinary achievement in developing a program of complete local health service in every area of the U.S."
