= William T. Bull =

American football player, coach, and physician (1865–1924)

Biographical details
- Born: November 10, 1865; Newport, Rhode Island, U.S.
- Died: November 8, 1924 (aged 58); Asheville, North Carolina, U.S.

Playing career
- 1886–1888: Yale
- Positions: Fullback, kicker

Coaching career (HC unless noted)
- 1892–1896: Wesleyan
- 1897: Carlisle
- 1917: Newport Naval Reserves
- c. 1920: Yale (backfield)

William Tillinghast Bull (November 10, 1865 – November 8, 1924) was an American college football player and coach, who later became a physician.

== Football career ==
Bull attended William S. Rogers High School in his native Newport, where he played baseball, crew, gymnastics, track and field, and wrestling, as well as football as a fullback and halfback. He then played college football at Yale University from 1886 to 1888, coached by Walter Camp.

Bull served as the first-ever head football coach in Wesleyan University history from 1892 and 1896. He then became the head coach at the Carlisle Indian Industrial School in 1897.

== Post-football career ==
In 1898, Bull entered the Yale School of Medicine, but transferred to the Columbia University College of Physicians and Surgeons two years later. He graduated from Columbia in 1902, receiving the Harsen Prize. Bull practiced medicine in New York City at Roosevelt Hospital, the Society for the Relief of the Ruptured and Crippled, and St. Luke's Hospital. As of 1906, he also practiced in Newport during the summers. He was a member of the American Medical Association.

== Personal life ==
Born to Henry and Sarah Munroe Barstow Russell, Bull is a descendant of Henry Bull, an early colonial Governor of Rhode Island. Bull's uncle of the same name (1849–1909) was also in the medical field as a surgeon and professor of surgery at Columbia University.

Bull married Florence Bush on February 3, 1896, in Brooklyn. The couple had six children: Henry (1901–1902), Cecil, Henry, Marguerite, Aline, and Mary.

A known Republican and Episcopalian, Bull died in 1924 in Asheville.
