= Louis McLane Hamilton =

American Civil War cavalry officer

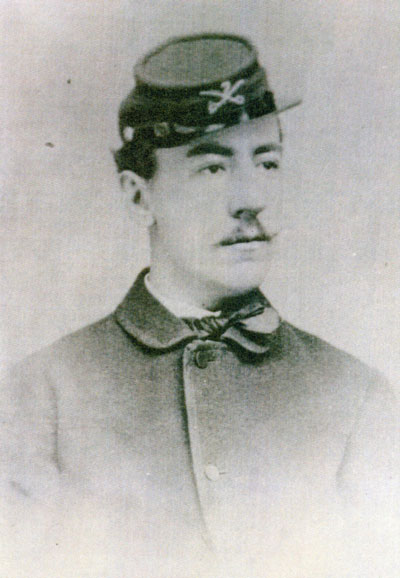
- Captain Louis McLane Hamilton
- Born: July 21, 1844; New York City, US
- Died: November 27, 1868 (aged 24); Washita Valley, Indian Territory, US
- Burial place: Fort Supply, Oklahoma, US; Rural Cemetery, Poughkeepsie, New York, US (reinterred)
- Relatives: Hamilton family
- Military career
- Allegiance: United States of America; Union
- Branch: United States Army; Cavalry; Union Army
- Service years: 1862–1868
- Rank: Captain; Brevet Major
- Commands: 3rd U.S. Infantry Regiment; 7th Cavalry Regiment
- Conflicts: American Civil War: Chancellorsville; Gettysburg; Petersburg; Appomattox; American Indian Wars: Battle of Washita River †

Louis McLane Hamilton (July 21, 1844 – November 27, 1868) was a cavalry officer in the United States Army during the American Civil War and the American Indian Wars. He served as a captain under General George Armstrong Custer in the Indian Territory in present-day Oklahoma, where he died at the age of 24 while leading a charge in the Battle of Washita River.

== Early life and family ==
Hamilton was born in New York City on July 21, 1844. He was a grandson of Alexander Hamilton, one of the Founding Fathers of the United States.

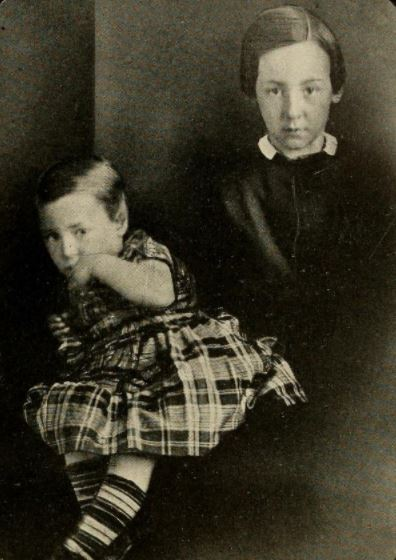
Allan and Louis Hamilton, 1851

His father, Philip Hamilton, was the youngest child of American founding father Alexander Hamilton and Elizabeth Schuyler Hamilton, born after his older brother Philip Hamilton was killed in a duel.

His mother was Rebecca McLane, daughter of Louis McLane (1786–1857), who was a member of the U.S. House and the U.S. Senate, the 10th Secretary of the Treasury, the 12th Secretary of State, and a two-time U.S. Minister to the United Kingdom. Her younger brother, Hamilton's uncle, was Robert Milligan McLane (1815–1898), a Governor of Maryland and U.S. Ambassador to Mexico, France, and China.

His younger brother, Allan McLane Hamilton, was an American psychiatrist and a Fellow of the Royal Society of Edinburgh.

== Military career ==
=== American Civil War ===
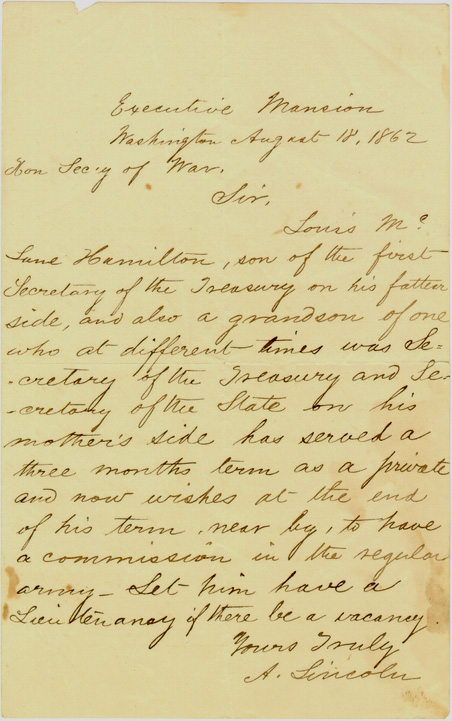
1862 letter from Abraham Lincoln on behalf of Hamilton

At the age of seventeen, in June 1862, Hamilton enlisted as a volunteer private in the 22nd New York State Militia, serving for three months at Harper's Ferry, West Virginia. Hamilton then returned home to Poughkeepsie, New York, where he immediately engaged in raising a company of volunteers.

On August 18, 1862, during Hamilton's term of service in the militia at Harper's Ferry, President Abraham Lincoln wrote a letter to Secretary of War Edwin Stanton, recommending that Hamilton be commissioned as a lieutenant in the regular army. He was given a commission as a second lieutenant in the 3rd U.S. Infantry Regiment on September 21, 1862.

Lieutenant Hamilton commanded a company in the Battle of Fredericksburg in December 1862, and again at the Battle of Chancellorsville early in May 1863, covering the retreat of the army across the Rappahannock River. As a result of his conspicuous "gallant and meritorious conduct" during the passage of the river, he was placed the next day on the staff of General Romeyn B. Ayres, who commanded the division.

While serving with the Army of the Potomac, Hamilton was promoted to first lieutenant and twice brevetted for gallantry, for his conduct during the battles at Chancellorville and Gettysburg.

He also fought at the Siege of Petersburg, and at the Battle of Appomattox Court House.

=== Service after the Civil War ===
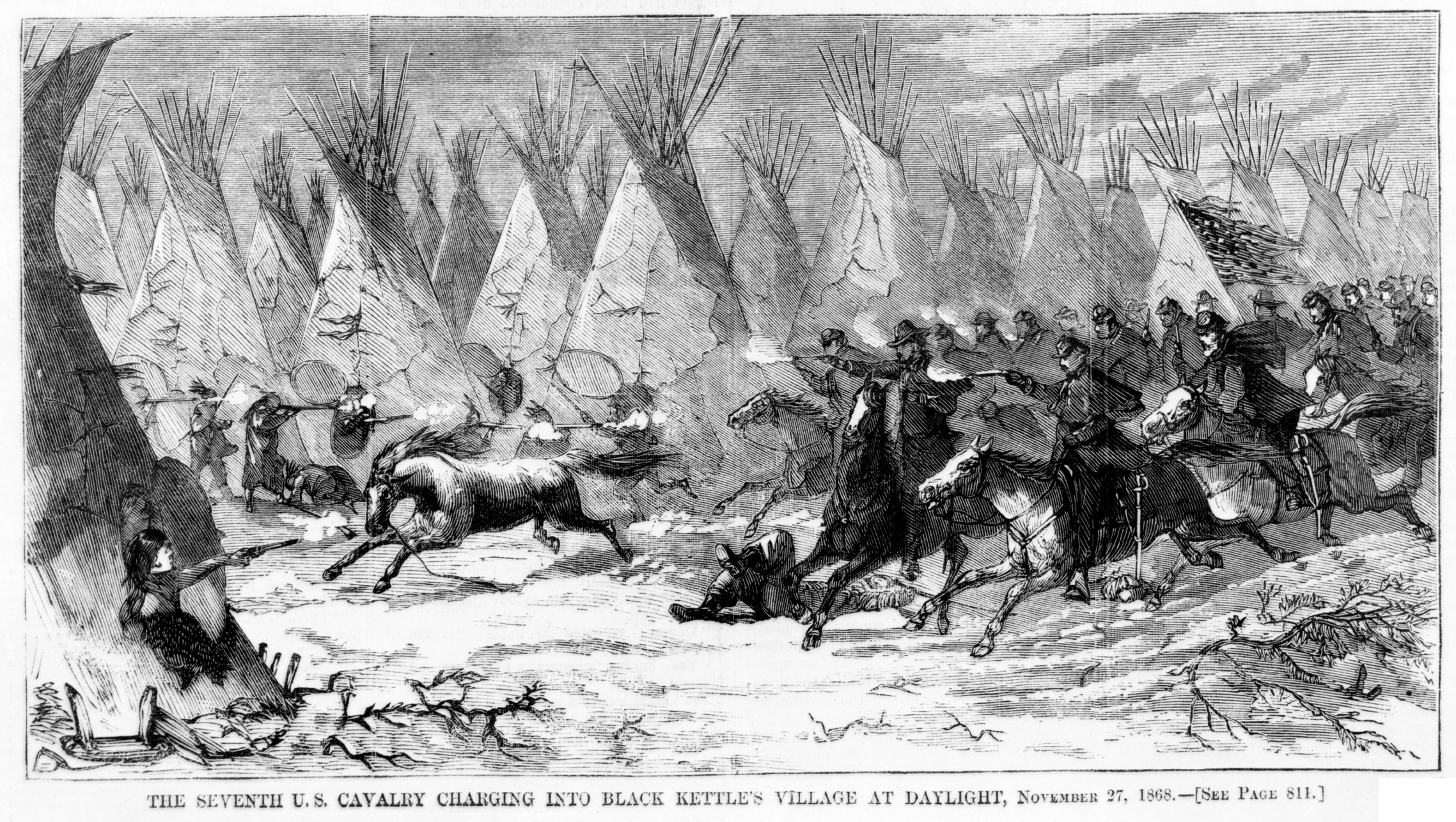
1868 engraving depicting the 7th Cavalry's raid on Black Kettle's encampment at Washita

In July 1866, Hamilton became a captain in the newly formed 7th U.S. Cavalry, which was under the command of then-Lieutenant Colonel George Armstrong Custer. Hamilton was the youngest officer of his rank in the regular service.

Hamilton was initially assigned to command Fort Lyon in Colorado. Later in the American Indian Wars, he served under General Custer in the Indian Territory, in present-day Oklahoma.

On June 24, 1867, Hamilton was in command of a small detachment during an expedition under General Winfield Scott Hancock. Captain Hamilton averted an Indian ambush near forks of the Republican River, and repulsed 45 attacking Sioux while pursuing a band of Sioux under Pawnee Killer.

On Thanksgiving Day, November 26, 1868, Captain Hamilton was serving as officer of the day in General Custer's command, with duties that normally would have caused him to remain behind the lines with a supply train.

[W]hen, for the purpose of more rapid pursuit, the troops were ordered to leave the train behind under a guard, [Hamilton's] place, as officer of the day, was with the train. But his soldier spirit could not brook the thought of allowing his squadron to face danger without him. So he appealed to his commander, with the earnestness almost of demand, to be allowed to accompany the pursuit.

Custer granted the request, and Hamilton was permitted to lead his squadron into battle, thirty miles to the south.

The next day, November 27, 1868, Hamilton became the first casualty in the Battle of Washita River, killed while leading the first charge of the troops in Custer's attack on Black Kettle's Cheyenne encampment. The battle plan placed Hamilton's squadron in the center of the formation, to charge the encampment while mounted. At dawn, Hamilton was heard calling to his men to "keep cool, fire low, and not too rapidly." He marshalled his squadron "in splendid style right up to the enemy's lodges," where he "fell dead from his horse, shot through the heart by a bullet from a Lancaster rifle" in the hands of a combatant concealed in a wigwam. An army surgeon later wrote that the "ball entered about five inches below the left nipple, and emerged near inferior angle of right scapula. Death was instantaneous."

== Legacy and personal life ==
Hamilton was buried the following week, on December 4, 1868, at Fort Supply. He was later reinterred at the Poughkeepsie Rural Cemetery in Poughkeepsie, New York, in a family plot where his parents were later buried.

Several days after Hamilton's death, a fellow captain in the 7th Cavalry Regiment sent a letter to the Army and Navy Journal memorializing Hamilton. From an encampment in Indian Territory, Captain Robert M. West wrote an account of Hamilton's charge, and concluded:

Hamilton's ambition was to be a perfect soldier. He was gallant in everything. It would have been safer to have aroused a sleeping lion than to have cast a shadow of suspicion upon his honor. While he was susceptible of the perfect phrensy of enthusiasm, and would brave danger and death in every form of duty, yet, in the quiet hours of life, he was gentle and winsome as a maiden. His strong intellect, refined by careful culture, enabled him to comprehend the "fluctuations and vast concerns" of life with rare intelligence and discrimination. His well stored mind was as delightful and fragrant, so to speak, as a beautiful garden. The training of his youth, and the examples suggested by parental affection and solicitude, were kept green in his memory by his overpowering attachment to parents and home. His conceptions of the Holy Scriptures were sublime. Thus attuned and trained, he lived a noble and blameless life, an honor to his profession and a worthy possessor of the great name which he inherited.

Hamilton was posthumously brevetted to the rank of major, for gallantry while leading his command.

His nephew Louis McLane Hamilton (1876–1911), the only child of Allan McLane Hamilton, was named in his memory.
