= Bernard L. Strehler =

Bernard Louis Strehler
- Born: February 21, 1925; Johnstown, Pennsylvania, U.S.
- Died: May 13, 2001 (aged 76); Agoura, California, U.S.
- Education: Johns Hopkins University (BS, PhD)
- Known for: Firefly luciferin; delayed light emission; biogerontology
- Notable work: Time, Cells, and Aging (1962)
- Scientific career
- Fields: Biochemistry, Gerontology, Photosynthesis
- Institutions: Oak Ridge National Laboratory; University of Chicago; National Institutes of Health; University of Southern California

Bernard Louis Strehler (1925–2001) was an American biochemist and biogerontologist whose work spanned photosynthesis, bioluminescence, and the biology of aging. Early in his career, he contributed to studies of firefly luminescence and, with William A. Arnold, demonstrated delayed light emission in photosynthetic systems. He later became a leading figure in gerontology, authoring Time, Cells, and Aging (1962) and directing the USC Ethel Percy Andrus Gerontology Center.

In 1949, he first purified firefly luciferin, which gives off light after being combined with ATP, magnesium ion, oxygen, and firefly luciferase. In 1956, he switched to the field of aging. He joined the faculty of the University of Southern California as a professor of biology and director of biological research at the USC Ethel Percy Andrus Gerontology Center.

== Biography ==
Strehler studied biology at Johns Hopkins University, where he graduated in 1947. Three years later, he also received his doctorate there. He then worked at the Oak Ridge National Laboratory in Tennessee. He identified luciferin, the luminescent substance of various beetle species, which he isolated from thousands of fireflies. Together with William A. Arnold, Strehler demonstrated in 1951 that green plants exhibit delayed light emission as a result of early steps in photosynthesis. In 1952, he discovered that plants build up adenosine triphosphate in the chloroplasts under the influence of light.

Strehler later became assistant professor of biochemistry at the University of Chicago. In 1956, he went to the National Institutes of Health, where he worked at the Gerontology Centre in Baltimore. The University of Southern California (USC) appointed him Professor of Biology in 1967. He remained at USC until his retirement in 1990. From 1960 onwards, Strehler devoted himself primarily to biogerontological topics. He noticed that the loss in human cells is seven times slower than in cells from domestic dogs. The factor seven is also found in the two maximum life spans of both species.

Strehler was regarded as one of the most prominent gerontologists of his time, with over 250 publications. He died of a stroke in a nursing home. He left behind two daughters and a son. His wife Theodora died three years before him.

== Bibliography ==
- Times, Cells, and Aging ASIN B01D4OEHOS
