= George Sumner Huntington =

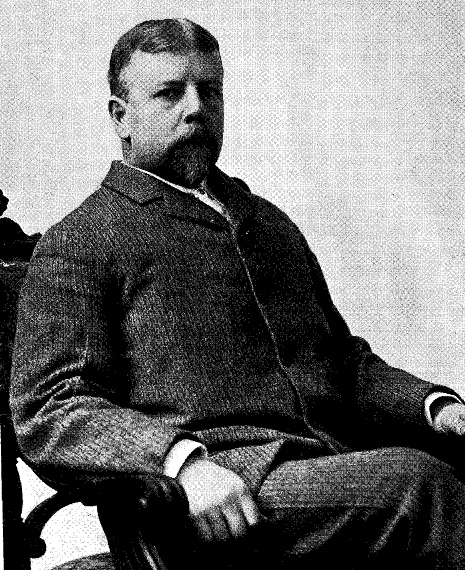
- Born: March 21, 1861; Hartford, Connecticut
- Died: January 5, 1927 (aged 65)
- Occupations: Professor, Doctor
- Writing career
- Genres: Science, Medicine

George Sumner Huntington (March 21, 1861 – January 5, 1927) was a medical doctor, a researcher into comparative anatomy, and a college professor. For thirty-five years he was a professor of anatomy at the Columbia University College of Physicians and Surgeons.

He had attended the college he taught at and graduated in 1897 with honors, winning 1st place in both the Harsen prize for Clinical Reports and for Proficiency in Examination. He served as the fifth president of the Association of American Anatomists from 1899 to 1903. Among other degrees he received was an honorary Bachelor of Laws from Jefferson Medical College in 1907.

== Personal life ==
Huntington was the son of Hezekiah Huntington and Katherine Brinley Sumner Huntington. He received his early education in Newport, Rhode Island and Baden. In 1885, he married Annie McNair Elderkin in Brattleboro, Vermont.
