= William A. Arnold =

American biophysicist and plant physiologist (1904–2001)

- Born: William Archibald Arnold; December 6, 1904; Douglas, Wyoming, U.S.
- Died: October 26, 2001 (aged 96)
- Education: California Institute of Technology (BS); Harvard University (PhD)
- Known for: Photosynthetic unit; delayed light emission; thermoluminescence in photosynthesis
- Awards: National Academy of Sciences (1962); Charles F. Kettering Award (1963)
- Scientific career
- Fields: Plant physiology, Biophysics, Photosynthesis
- Institutions: Oak Ridge National Laboratory
- Doctoral advisor: William J. Crozier

William Archibald Arnold (December 6, 1904 – October 26, 2001) was an American plant physiologist and biophysicist whose work helped establish the physical basis of photosynthesis. He is known for experiments with Robert Emerson that led to the concept of the photosynthetic unit, and for later discoveries including delayed light emission and thermoluminescence in photosynthetic systems.

== Early life and education ==
Arnold was born in Douglas, Wyoming, on December 6, 1904, the eldest of four children of William A. Arnold and Nellie Agnes O’Brien Arnold. His father operated a lumber yard and contracting business. Around 1910, the family moved to Pleasant Hill, Oregon, where Arnold began school and developed an early interest in reading and mathematics.

In 1920, the family relocated to the San Fernando Valley in Southern California. Arnold attended high school in Van Nuys, where he became interested in radio and astronomy, building radio receivers with classmates and visiting the Mount Wilson Observatory. He also attended public lectures at the California Institute of Technology, which led him to enroll there after graduating from high school in 1923.

While at Caltech, Arnold supported himself through a variety of jobs and worked as a research assistant under physicist Samuel Jackson Barnett from UCLA, conducting experiments in terrestrial magnetism. As an undergraduate, he also worked with Robert Emerson on photosynthesis, leading to early studies that contributed to the concept of the photosynthetic unit.

He later pursued graduate studies at Harvard University, where he completed his Ph.D. in 1935 under the supervision of the physiologist William J. Crozier, whose laboratory emphasized quantitative approaches to biological systems.

== Career ==
During World War II, Arnold worked on defense-related research, including optical and instrumentation problems, and later contributed to uranium isotope separation efforts; after the war, he joined Oak Ridge National Laboratory, where he applied physical methods to the study of photosynthesis.

== Research and scientific contributions ==
=== Photosynthetic unit ===
As an undergraduate at Caltech, Arnold worked with Robert Emerson on experiments using intermittent light in algae. These studies demonstrated that a large number of chlorophyll molecules act together in a functional unit to produce a single molecule of oxygen, leading to the concept of the "photosynthetic unit".

Their 1932 papers showed that approximately 2,400 chlorophyll molecules were associated with the production of one molecule of oxygen under optimal conditions.

=== Quantum efficiency and early biophysics ===
Arnold’s doctoral work provided some of the first reliable measurements of the quantum requirement of photosynthesis, showing that more photons were required than previously assumed. These findings were supported by early experimental studies on photosynthetic kinetics and light responses.

=== Delayed light emission and thermoluminescence ===
At Oak Ridge National Laboratory, Arnold and Bernard L. Strehler discovered delayed light emission (delayed fluorescence) in photosynthetic organisms in 1951, demonstrating that absorbed light energy could be stored and later re-emitted.

Together with Helen Sherwood, Arnold later identified thermoluminescence in chloroplasts, showing that previously absorbed light energy could be released upon heating, a phenomenon that became an important tool for studying photosynthetic mechanisms. Arnold also collaborated with Robert Oppenheimer on studies of excitation energy transfer and the electronic properties of photosynthetic processes to understand energy transfer mechanisms in photosynthetic pigments.

=== Other contributions ===
Arnold worked broadly across physics and biology, including studies of fluorescence polarization, electroluminescence in chloroplasts, and energy transfer mechanisms. In later work with Jim Azzi, he identified electroluminescence in photosynthetic systems and demonstrated the effects of electric fields on chloroplasts, providing additional insight into the mechanisms of delayed light production.

While working in Copenhagen in 1938–1939, Arnold was present during early experiments on nuclear fission and participated in discussions with Otto Robert Frisch, in which he suggested the biological analogy of "binary fission"; Frisch subsequently adopted the term "fission" for the process.

== Honors and recognition ==
Arnold was elected to the National Academy of Sciences in 1962.

He received the Charles F. Kettering Award from the American Society of Plant Physiologists in 1963 for applying physical principles to biological systems.

He was also awarded the Charles Reid Barnes Life Membership Award in 1975.

== Personal life ==
Arnold married Jean Irving Tompkins on September 11, 1929; they remained married for 68 years until her death in 1997. They had two daughters.

Arnold was known for his emphasis on simplicity and precision in scientific work and for his interdisciplinary approach spanning physics, biology, and chemistry.

He died on October 26, 2001, at the age of 96. In accordance with his wishes, he was cremated and his ashes were buried next to his wife’s at Oak Ridge Memorial Park.
