= Edwin Ellis (artist) =

English painter

Edwin Ellis (1842–1895) was an English artist born in Nottingham, England. He started working life as a lace draughtsman. As an artist he was known for his dramatic paintings of the British coastline, particularly around Yorkshire, Wales and Cornwall. He painted mainly in oils in a broad, impressionistic style. He also painted in watercolour. He exhibited extensively at the Royal Society of British Artists (elected member in 1875), the Royal Academy and many other galleries in London and other UK cities. A major retrospective exhibition of his work was held at the Nottingham Museum and Art Gallery in 1893. He declared himself bankrupt, was involved in two divorce proceedings and died in London of alcohol related problems. At one time he was married to the former wife of American painter George Henry Yewell.

Forty-seven of his oil paintings are held in UK public art collections.
