= Harsen Prize =

The Harsen prize was an academic prize, accompanied by tiered cash awards, that was given to graduating students of the Columbia University College of Physicians and Surgeons in New York City during the 19th and early 20th centuries. Different categories of the prize included "Clinical Reports" and "Proficiency in Examination". In 1884 first prize under "Proficiency in Examination" was accompanied by an award of US$500 (about $18,000 in current dollars), second place received US$300, and third place received US$200.

== Recipients ==
- George Frederick Shrady, Sr. 1861
- Allan McLane Hamilton 1870
- Charles Henry May, 1st prize Clinical Reports, 1st prize Proficiency in Examination 1883
- George Sumner Huntington, 1st prize Clinical Reports, 1st prize Proficiency in Examination 1884
- L. S. Manson, 2nd prize Clinical Reports 1884
- G. W. Weld, 3rd prize Clinical Reports 1884
- George Roe Lockwood, Jr., 2nd prize Proficiency in Examination 1884
- E. K. Morton, 3rd prize Proficiency in Examination 1884
- Ervin Alden Tucker for Proficiency in All Branches of Medical Teaching 1885
- William Gilman Thompson for an essay 1885
- Edward Wight Clarke 1887
- Levi Olmstead Wiggins circa 1889
- Austin Wilkinson Hollis 1890
- Alexis Moschcowitz 1891
- William Van Valzah Hayes 1893
- Albert Ashton Berg in Clinical Reports 1894
- Archibald Henry Busby, 1st prize Clinical Reports 1898
- Edward A. Rosenberg, 2nd prize Clinical Reports 1898
- R. J. Held, 3rd prize Clinical Reports 1898
- Victor C. Peterson, 1st prize Proficiency in Examination 1898
- Philip Schieffelin Sabine, 2nd prize Proficiency in Examination 1898
- Hughes Dayton, 3rd prize Proficiency in Examination 1898
- William W. Vibbert, honors in Proficiency in Examination 1898
- George A. Saxe, honors in Proficiency in Examination 1898
- John M. Taylor, honors in Proficiency in Examination 1898
- Emil A. Rundquist, honors in Proficiency in Examination 1898
- Charles M. Williams, honors in Proficiency in Examination 1898
- Burton J. Lee, honors in Proficiency in Examination 1898
- Stanley O. Sabel, honors in Proficiency in Examination 1898
- Haven Emerson, 1901
- William T. Bull, 1902
