= Poughkeepsie Rural Cemetery =

Cemetery in Poughkeepsie, New York

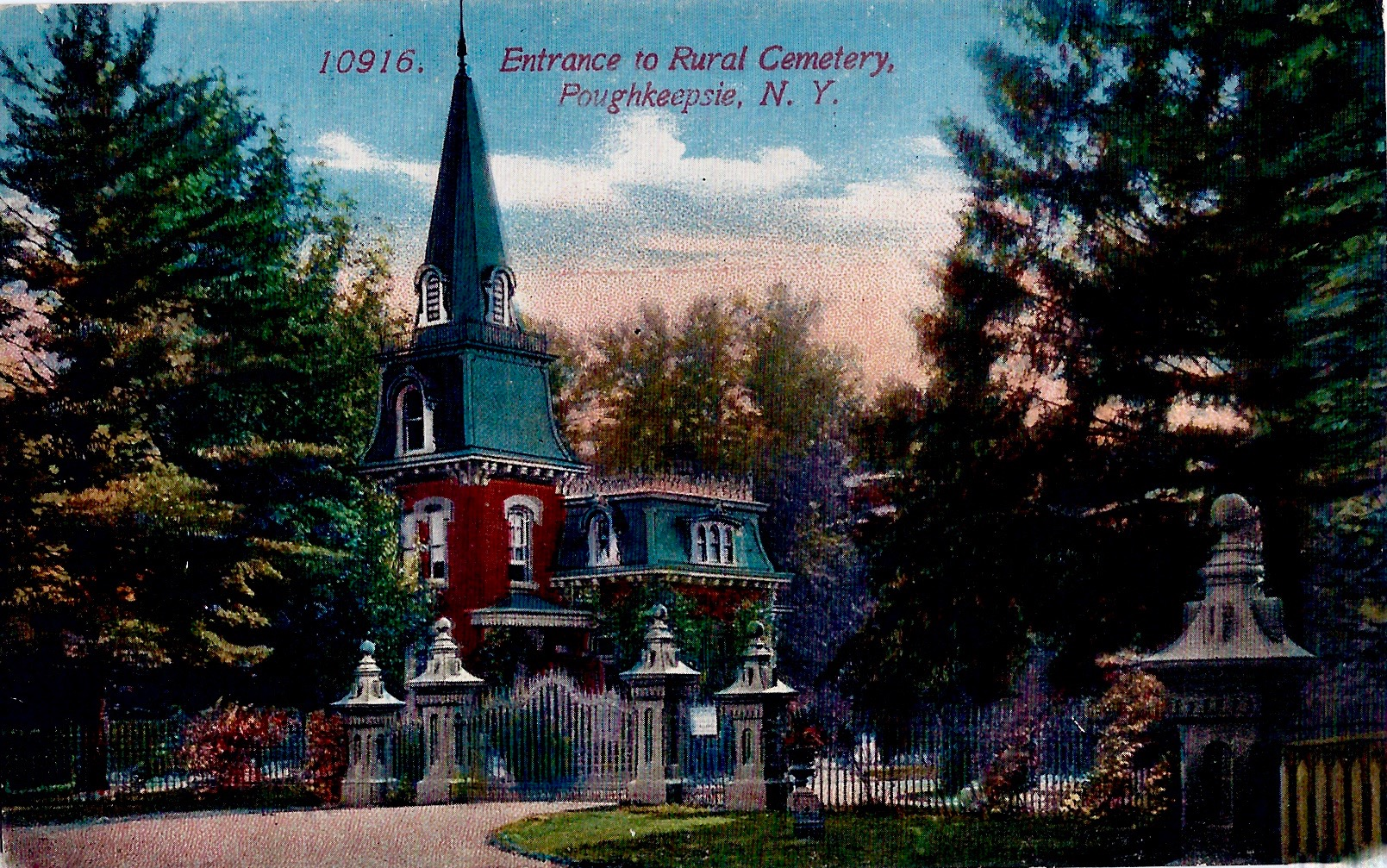
- Postcard showing entrance to Poughkeepsie Rural Cemetery, c. 1907
- Interactive map of Poughkeepsie Rural Cemetery

Details
- Established: 1853
- Location: Poughkeepsie, New York, US
- Coordinates: 41.6831°N 73.9320°W
- Size: 165 acres
- Website: Official website
- Find a Grave: Poughkeepsie Rural Cemetery

The Poughkeepsie Rural Cemetery is a rural cemetery located in Poughkeepsie, New York and includes the gravesites of several notable figures. It also has a crematory. The forty-four acres of land used for the cemetery were purchased by Matthew Vassar.

Some of its architectural features were designed by J. A. Wood. His work includes the cemetery gates and gatehouse, the Frost Mausoleum, and a monument for Matthew Vassar's nephew, John Guy Vassar.

== Hamilton and Schuyler families ==
Several relatives of Alexander Hamilton, a Founding Father of the United States, are buried at the Poughkeepsie Rural Cemetery:

- Allan McLane Hamilton (1848–1919), psychiatrist
- Louis McLane Hamilton (1844–1868), cavalry officer in the Civil War and American Indian Wars
- Philip Hamilton (1802–1884), lawyer, Judge Advocate (Navy Retiring Board), youngest son of Alexander Hamilton
- Philip Jeremiah Schuyler (1768–1835), politician (House of Representatives and New York State Senate), brother of Elizabeth Schuyler Hamilton, Angelica Schuyler Church and Margarita Schuyler Van Rensselaer.

== Notable burials ==
Other notable individuals buried or cremated at the Poughkeepsie Rural Cemetery include:

- Theodorus Bailey (1758–1828), politician (Member of the United States House of Representatives and United States Senate)
- Stephen Baker (1819–1875), politician (Member of the US House of Representatives)
- Jane Bolin (1908–2007), judge (New York City Domestic Relations Court)
- Harvey G. Eastman (1832–1878), educator (founder of Eastman Business College) and politician (New York State Assembly)
- James Emott (1771–1850), politician (Member of the US House of Representatives and New York State Assembly)
- Margaret Hamilton (1902–1985), actress, played the Wicked Witch in The Wizard of Oz (Note: Cremated. Her ashes were scattered at her estate in Amenia, New York.)
- Frank Hasbrouck (1852–1928), lawyer, county judge, Superintendent of the New York State Insurance Department
- Dustin John Higgs (1972–2021), American convicted murderer executed by the United States federal government
- Charles Johnston (1793–1845), politician (Member of the US House of Representatives)
- Anandi Gopal Joshi (1865–1887), first female Indian doctor, buried under the name "Anandabai Joshee" with the Carpenter family.
- John J. Kindred (1864–1937), politician (Member of the US House of Representatives)
- Henry A. Livingston (1776–1849), politician (New York State Senate)
- Johnny Miller (1905–2008), gyroplane pioneer, test pilot and airline pilot
- Sterling Morrison (1942-1995), lead guitarist for American rock band The Velvet Underground
- Samuel Neilson (1761–1803), Irish nationalist
- Homer Augustus Nelson (1829–1891), politician (Member of the United States House of Representatives, United States Senate and New York Secretary of State)
- Edmund Platt (1865–1939), politician (Member of the US House of Representatives) and member of United States Federal Reserve
- Charles H. Ruggles (1789–1865), politician (Member of the US House of Representatives) and judge (Chief Judge United States Court of Appeal)
- James Fields Smathers (1888–1967), inventor
- William Wallace Smith I (1830–1913) and Andrew Smith (1836–1895), founders of Smith Brothers Cough Drops
- John Thompson (1809–1890), politician (Member of the US House of Representatives)
- Smith Thompson (1768–1843), Associate Justice United States Supreme Court and politician (United States Secretary of the Navy)
- Rip Torn (1931–2019), actor
- Isaac Van Anden (1812–1875), publisher of the Brooklyn Eagle
- Matthew Vassar (1792–1868), brewer, merchant, founder of Vassar College

== See also ==
- List of burial places of justices of the Supreme Court of the United States
