= Philip Hamilton (lawyer) =

American lawyer and son of Alexander Hamilton

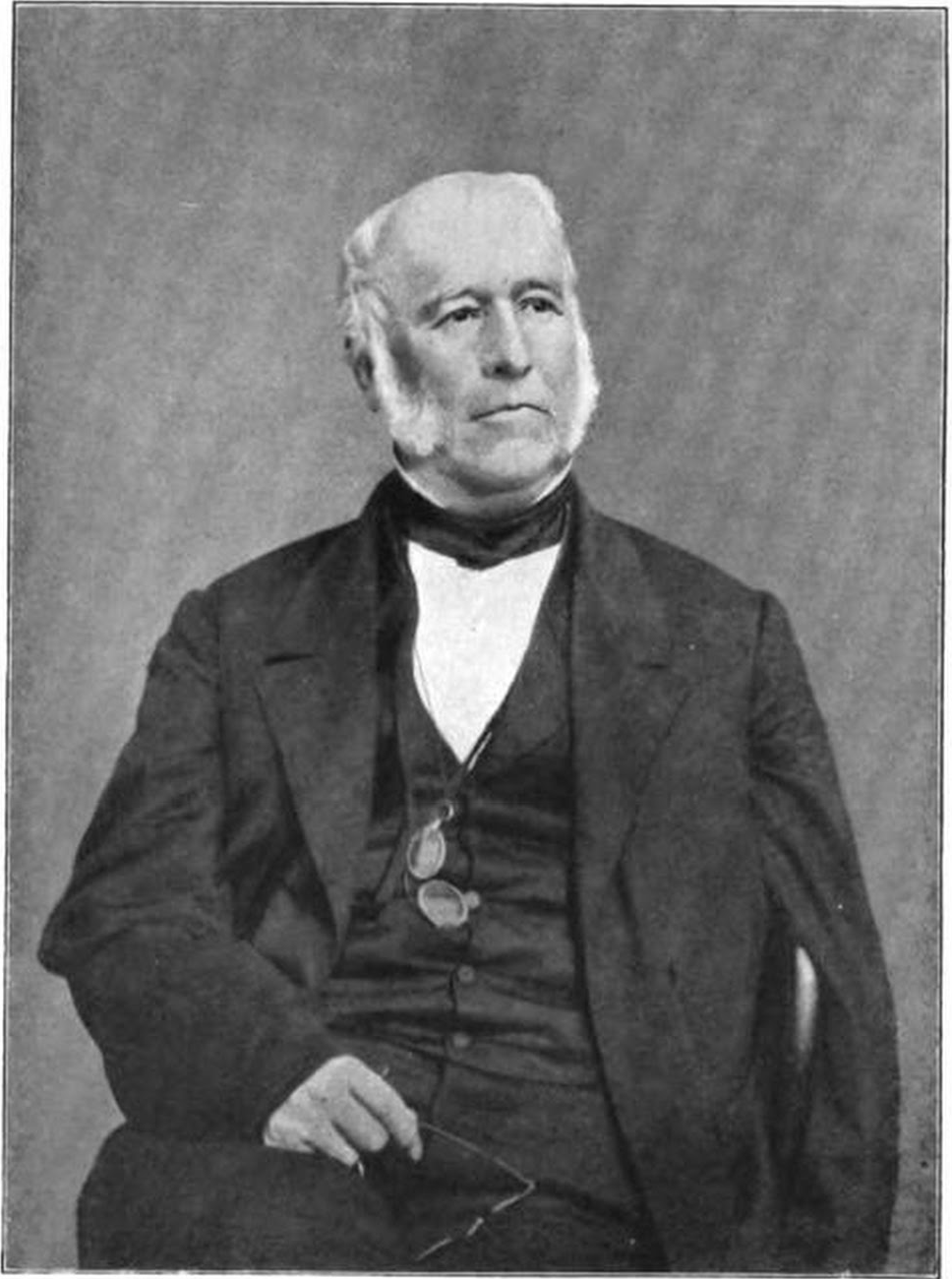
- Hamilton in 1880
- Born: June 2, 1802; New York City, New York, U.S.
- Died: July 9, 1884 (aged 82); Poughkeepsie, New York, U.S.
- Burial place: Poughkeepsie Rural Cemetery
- Occupation: Lawyer
- Spouse: Rebecca McLane
- Children: Louis; Allan
- Parent(s): Alexander Hamilton (father); Elizabeth Schuyler Hamilton (mother)
- Relatives: See Hamilton family

Philip Hamilton II (June 2, 1802 – July 9, 1884) was the youngest child of Elizabeth Schuyler Hamilton and Alexander Hamilton. He was named in memory of his oldest brother, Philip Hamilton.

== Early life ==
Hamilton was born in New York City. The day of his birth in 1802 was June 2 by his son's account, or June 1 according to his New York Herald obituary and his gravestone.

The youngest child of Alexander Hamilton and Elizabeth Schuyler Hamilton, he was born less than a year after the death of his oldest brother, Philip Hamilton, after whom he was named. He was called "Little Phil" by family, and later was formally known as "Philip Hamilton (the Second)". The older Philip, who was named for his grandfather Philip Schuyler, was killed in a duel with George Eacker on November 24, 1801.

According to Hamilton's son, psychiatrist Allan McLane Hamilton, the younger Philip "manifested much of his father's sweetness and happy disposition, and was always notably considerate of the feelings of others, and was punctilious to a fault in his obligations." Due to his widowed mother's poverty after Alexander Hamilton's death in 1804, during his childhood Philip "was denied those advantages accorded to his elder brothers, and had, in every sense, to make his own way."

Hamilton stood nearly six feet tall. He had no college education but was able to enter the profession of law after studying with one of his brothers in New York.

== Professional career ==
Hamilton practiced law in New York, and served as an assistant United States Attorney during the 1830s under his older brother James Alexander Hamilton. As a prosecutor, he achieved a notable success in his trial and conviction of the pirate Charles Gibbs. Gibbs was sentenced to death for the murder of a ship's captain and mate, and was hanged on April 22, 1831.

In 1851, during the California Gold Rush, Hamilton moved to San Francisco to practice law as a partner of his wife's brother Robert Milligan McLane. Hamilton returned to New York after one or two years.

His legal practice was primarily in admiralty cases, with clients that included then-Commodore Silas H. Stringham. At the end of the Civil War, Hamilton served as Judge Advocate of the Naval Retiring Board at the Brooklyn Navy Yard. According to the New York Herald, he "led a quiet life" after 1865.

Hamilton's son characterized his career as "a hard, up-hill professional life," with legal clients that included a "very great" number of the poor, especially sailors, and much of his time "given up to unselfish acts."

== Personal life ==
An abolitionist, Hamilton assisted the Underground Railroad in the escape of at least one slave by concealing the fugitive in his cellar until he could safely resume his travel to Canada.

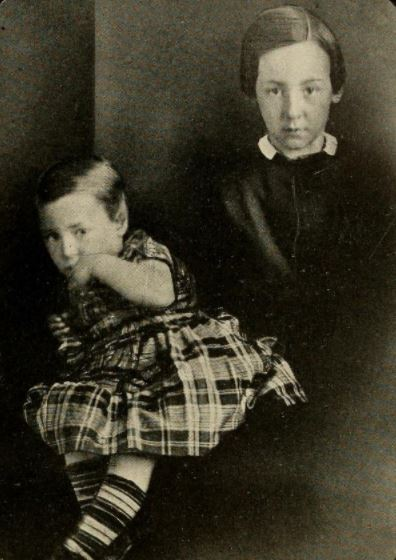
Photograph of Hamilton's sons, Allan and Louis, 1851

On December 29, 1842, Hamilton married Rebecca McLane, who died on April 1, 1893, at the age of 80. She was the daughter of Louis McLane (1786–1857), who was a member of the U.S. House, the U.S. Senate, the 10th Secretary of the Treasury, the 12th Secretary of State, and a two-time U.S. Minister to the United Kingdom. Her younger brother, Robert Milligan McLane (1815–1898), was a Governor of Maryland and served as U.S. Ambassador to Mexico, France, and China.

Together, Philip and Rebecca had two sons:

- Louis McLane Hamilton (1844–1868), who served in the United States Army during the American Civil War, and later served under General George Armstrong Custer in the Indian Territory in present-day Oklahoma. He was killed at the age of 24 while leading the first charge in Custer's attack on Black Kettle's Cheyenne encampment in the Battle of Washita River.
- Allan McLane Hamilton FRSE (1848–1919), who was a psychiatrist and a Fellow of the Royal Society of Edinburgh. His books included a biography of his grandfather, called The Intimate Life of Alexander Hamilton (1910).

Philip Hamilton died, "comparatively poor," on July 9, 1884, in Poughkeepsie, New York.

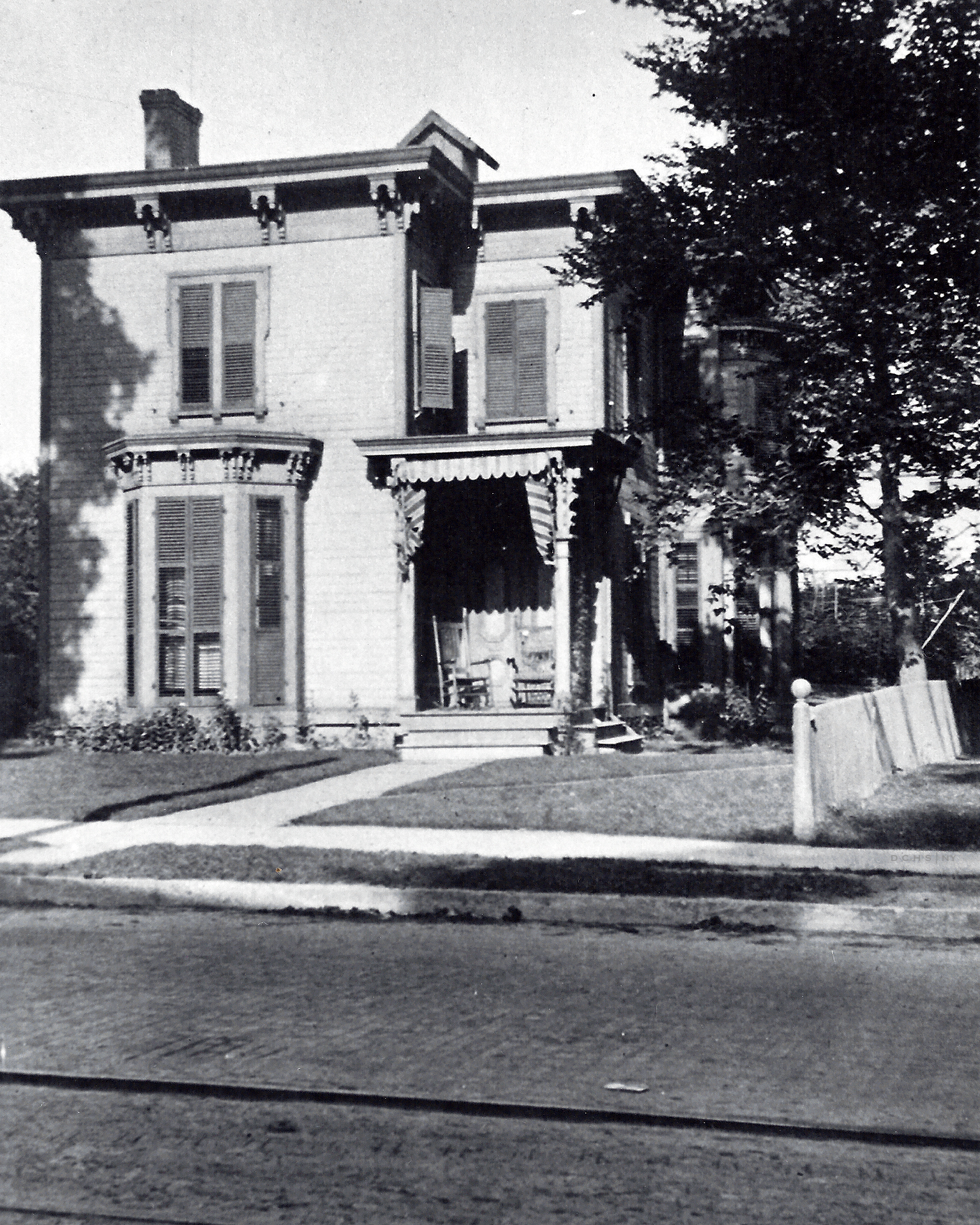
Philip and Rebecca McLane Hamilton's home in Poughkeepsie, New York. Undated photo.
