= Theodore S. Parvin =

American lawyer

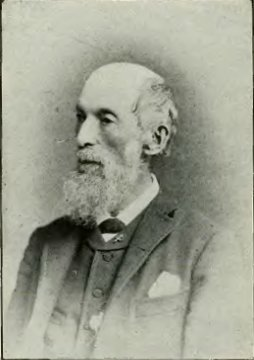
Portrait of Theodore S. Parvin

Theodore Sutton Parvin was an American lawyer, college professor, Iowa government official, and amateur historian. He was an organizer of the State Historical Society of Iowa and served several years as its secretary and as editor of the Annals of Iowa. He was one of the founders of the Masonic Order of Iowa and has been Grand Master and Grand Secretary of the Grand Lodge of the State for many years

== Early life ==
Parvin was born on January 15, 1817, in Cumberland County, New Jersey. In 1833 he graduated at Woodworth College, Ohio, and began the study of law, graduating at the Cincinnati Law School in 1837.

== Career ==
In 1838 Robert Lucas, who had been appointed Governor of the new Territory of Iowa, selected Parvin as his private secretary. He accompanied the Governor to Burlington where he was appointed to take charge of the Territorial library.

In 1839, Parvin was appointed District Attorney of the Middle District and removed to Bloomington. He served three terms as probate judge. In 1844, he rendered Iowa an enduring service by cooperating with Enoch W. Eastman and Frederick D. Mills in defeating the Constitution which proposed to deprive the State of the counties of the Missouri slope.

Upon the organization of the United States District Court in 1846, Parvin was appointed clerk, a position he held for ten years. In 1857, he was nominated for Register of the State Land Office by the Democrats and, notwithstanding the Republican majority of more than 2,000 in the election for Governor the same year, Parvin was elected.

He was one of the first trustees of the State University and was for ten years a professor of natural science in that institution. Parvin served as a schoolteacher in Cincinnati schools for several years; among his pupils there was the painter George Henry Yewell, later to become prominent in Iowa affairs himself.

== Personal life ==
He was one of the organizers of the State Historical Society and served several years as its secretary and as editor of the Annals of Iowa, a historical magazine published by the society. Parvin made large contributions to the library, newspaper files, and general collections of that Society, and for more than thirty years was one of the most valued writers of historical and biographical articles for the Annals of Iowa and the Historical Record. Having been one of the first officials of the Territory and long associated with its public affairs, personally acquainted with prominent men of all parties for more than sixty years, Parvin was long regarded as the highest authority on Iowa history and biography.

He was one of the founders of the Masonic Order of Iowa and served as Grand Master and Grand Secretary of the Grand Lodge of the State. In his capacity as secretary, he assembled at their building in Cedar Rapids a large Masonic library. He also collected and donated a collection of Iowa books and rare documents to the library. Parvin contributed early Iowa newspapers, legislative journals, session laws, and other rare publications to the State and Historical libraries. He was a member of the Pioneer Lawmakers' Association, where he contributed historical material, and wrote and spoke on Iowa historical subjects over a fifty-year period.

He died at his home in Cedar Rapids, on June 28, 1901.
