= Torsten Thunberg =

Swedish physiologist and biochemist (1873-1952)

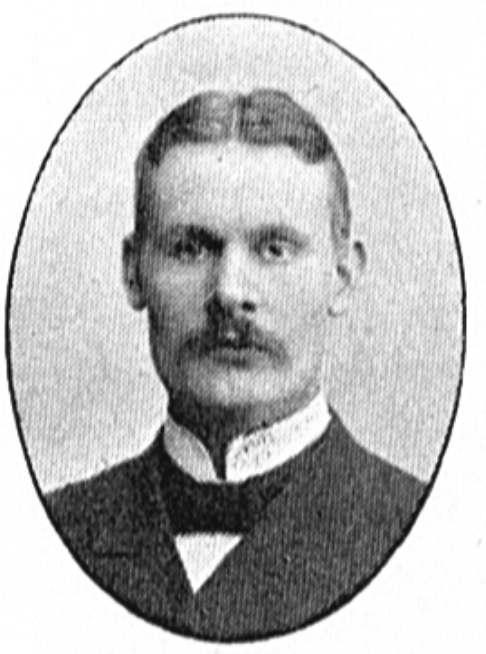

Torsten Ludvig Thunberg (30 June 1873 – 4 December 1952) was a Swedish physiologist and biochemist who worked on metabolic oxidation, including examinations of key steps in the tricarboxylic acid cycle, producing insights that were later elucidated by Hans A. Krebs. He was a professor of physiology at the University of Lund. The Thunberg grill illusion, also called the thermal grill illusion was discovered by him. The so-called Thunberg tube for examining biological redox reactions was also named after him.

== Life and work ==
Thunberg was born in Torsaker, Sweden to businessman Per Erik Thunberg and Wendela Maria Elisabeth Hård. He studied medicine at the University of Uppsala and received an MD with a thesis on epidermal sensory organs and perception. He worked at the Institute of Physiological Chemistry in 1893-94 under Olof Hammarsten and the next two years at the Institute of Physiology at Uppsala under Frithiof Homgren. His 1896 work noted what is now called the "thermal grill illusion", a perception of extreme heat and pain from placing closely interlaced warm (40 °C) and cold (20 °C) stimuli on the skin. He also noted that pinpricks produced two impulses of pain with differences in timing which were later shown to be due to different nerve fibre groups. He moved to the University of Lund in 1904, shortly after the death of Magnus Blix. Thunberg contributed to Willibald Nagel's Handbuch Der Physiologie Des Menschen. Thunberg examined oxidative metabolism and began experiments with Heinrich Wieland. He developed a micro-respirometer to measure oxygen use and carbon dioxide production by tissues. In 1912 he examined dehyrogenase enzyme activity using methylene blue indicators and noted the role of succinate in a chain of compounds. The use of methylene blue indicator led to rapid advances in metabolic studies. In 1924 Thunberg designed a casing with air pressure pumps to assist polio victims breathe. His "barospirator" was modified by others and was used as prior art by John H. Emerson to invalidate the patent of Philip Drinker for an iron lung.

Thunberg was also involved in social activism in his student years at Uppsala, taking part in the "Verdandi", along with Hjalmar Öhrvall. The "Temperance Order Verdandi" (Nykterhetsorden Verdandi) was founded in 1896 and had socialist goals and worked towards temperance measures. He was elected to the Royal Swedish Academy of Sciences in 1928. He died following a fracture of his thigh in 1952.
