= Isaac Van Anden =

American newspaper publisher (1812–1875)

- Born: December 12, 1812; Poughkeepsie, New York, U.S.
- Died: August 4, 1875 (aged 62); Poughkeepsie, New York, U.S.
- Occupation: Newspaper publisher
- Known for: Founder, manager, and proprietor of the Brooklyn Eagle
- Office: Presidential elector for New York (1868)
- Parent(s): Abraham Van Anden and Mary Lawless
- Relatives: William Van Anden (brother)

Isaac Van Anden (December 12, 1812 – August 4, 1875) was an American newspaper publisher and founder of the Brooklyn Eagle.

== Life ==
Van Anden was born on December 12, 1812, in Poughkeepsie, New York, the son of Abraham Van Anden and Mary Lawless.

Van Anden grew up on his father's farm. At a young age, he became an apprentice for the Dutchess County newspaper Poughkeepsie Telegraph. In 1837, he formed a partnership with Alexander Lee, bought the Westchester Spy from Samuel G. Arnold, and settled in White Plains. He then sold the Spy to Lee, moved to Brooklyn, and published the Brooklyn Advocate with Arnold. In 1840, the paper was merged with the Brooklyn Daily News but remained under the same management.

The Daily News was a non-partisan newspaper, but William A. Green bought the paper to make it a Whig paper. The firm Arnold & Van Anden was dissolved, but Van Anden retained much of the equipment from the Advocate and conducted a small printing office. In 1841, Henry C. Murphy and other Democrats in the city founded a Democratic paper, the Brooklyn Eagle, and made Van Anden the paper's manager and publisher. Murphy was elected mayor of Brooklyn later that year, and in 1842 Van Anden became the sole proprietor of the newspaper. Van Anden and the Eagle were Democrats, but under him the paper had an independent lean. Under him, the paper grew in prominence and eventually had the largest circulation of any evening newspaper in the country. He was also an early supporter and later commissioner of Prospect Park and a director of the Mechanics' Bank, the Brooklyn and Standard Life Insurance Companies, and the Safe Deposit Company.

Van Anden was a presidential elector in the 1868 presidential election. He sold the Eagle to the Eagle Association in 1870. He never married.

Van Anden died at his brother William's home in Poughkeepsie on August 4, 1875. He was buried in the Poughkeepsie Rural Cemetery.
