= William Gilman Thompson =

American physician and writer

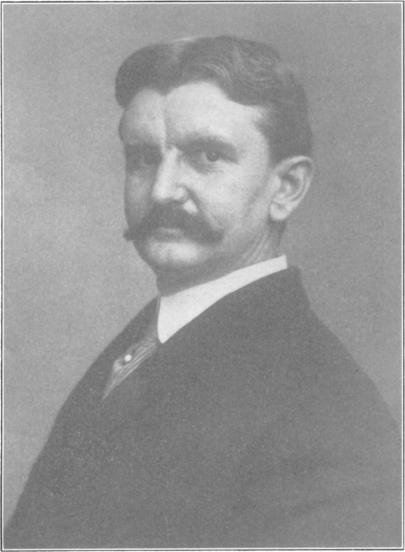
- Born: December 26, 1856
- Died: October 27, 1927 (aged 70)
- Occupations: Physician, writer

William Gilman Thompson (December 26, 1856 - October 27, 1927) was an American physician, dietitian and medical writer.

== Biography ==
Gilman attended Yale Sheffield Scientific School, receiving a Ph. B. in 1877. The then pursued medical training at Columbia University, graduating in 1880. He would also receive training at Humboldt University of Berlin and King's College Hospital, London.

He was a founder and president of the New York Clinic for the Functional Re-education of Disabled Soldiers, Sailors, and Civilians (later renamed Reconstruction Hospital, which then merged with N.Y.U. Bellevue). He became a professor of medicine at New York University Medical College, at Woman's Medical College, and at Cornell University Medical College in New York City, retiring as a professor emeritus. He consolidated the Demilt Dispensary and Park Hospital with the New York Clinic. He was appointed consulting physician to Bellevue Hospital and Nassau Hospital, Mineola Medical Service, Woman's Hospital, Lawrence Hospital and to the Standard Oil Company. Thompson was also appointed the consultant in industrial hygiene for the Public Health Service and served as a member of the Council of National Defense, chairman of Industrial Hygiene Division of New York State Labor Department, a trustee of the New York Academy of Medicine, serving as its vice-president from 1904 to 1907. Thompson was also President of the New York Botanical Garden, Vice President of Lenox Garden Club and author of medical books, several still used to teach medicine in 2017.

== Personal life ==
Thompson's parents were the abolitionist and Congregational minister Joseph Parrish Thompson and Elizabeth Coit Gilman Thompson, sister of the educator Daniel Coit Gilman. He married Harriet Howard Pomeroy, daughter of John Norton Pomeroy and Ann Rebecca (Carter) Pomeroy.

== Published works ==
- Practical Dietetics: With Special Reference to Diet in Disease, 1895
- The Occupational Diseases: Their Causation, Symptoms, Treatment and Prevention, 1914
- A System of Practical Medicine, 1900
- Training Schools for Nurses, 1883
- Thompson contributed numerous articles to medical journals and in 1897 was co-editor of American System of Medicine; contributed to Wood's Reference Handbook on the Medical Sciences and Occupational Diseases and Neurosis (1915), to Loose Leaf System of Medicine and Musser and Kelly's Practical Treatment (1917), and to Nelson's Loose Leaf Encyclopedia (1919).

== Awards ==
Joseph Mather Smith Prize for an essay on the valves of the heart.

Harsen Prize
