= Alexis Moschcowitz =

Slovakia surgeon

Alexis Victor Moschcowitz (April 25, 1865 − December 21, 1933) was a surgeon. He was born in Giralt, now in Slovakia but at that time part of the Austrian Empire, and emigrated to New York when he was 15 years old. He received a degree in pharmacy in 1885 and later entered the College of Physicians and Surgeons of Columbia University, graduating in 1891. He was one of the recipients of the Harsen Prize. He was an intern at Lenox Hill Hospital after he graduated, and in 1898 began working at Mount Sinai Hospital. He reached the rank of colonel during World War I, working at Camp Anniston in Alabama and in Asheville, North Carolina, before becoming a consultant in the Surgeon General's office in Washington.

He was an expert on the treatment of hernias and wrote a book on the subject, and a surgical procedure for femoral herniorrhaphy that he first described is known as the Moschcowitz operation.
