= Thomas Hicks (painter) =

American painter (1823–1890)

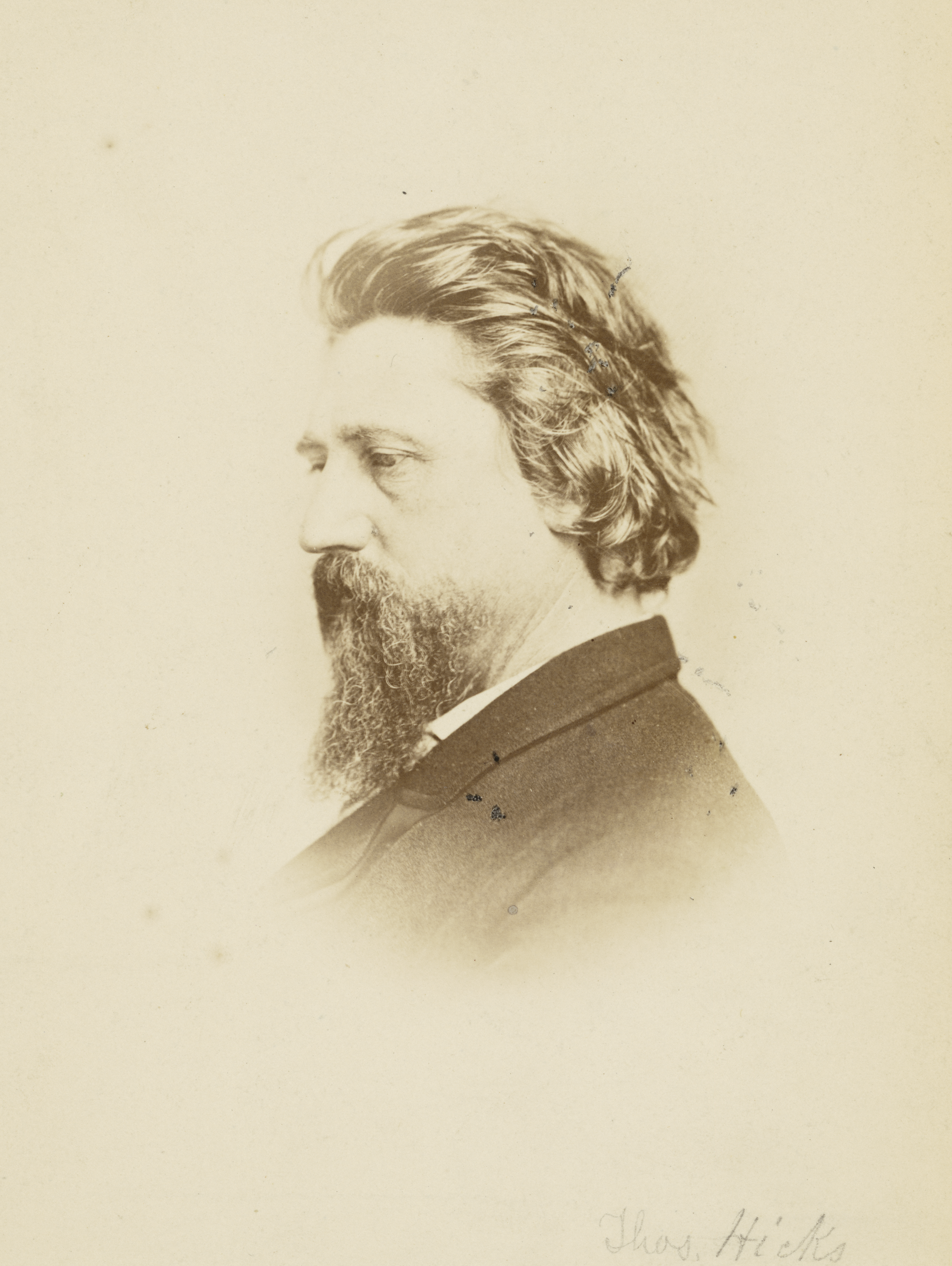
- Portrait of Hicks, c. 1865
- Born: October 18, 1823; Newtown
- Died: October 8, 1890 (aged 66)
- Occupation: Painter

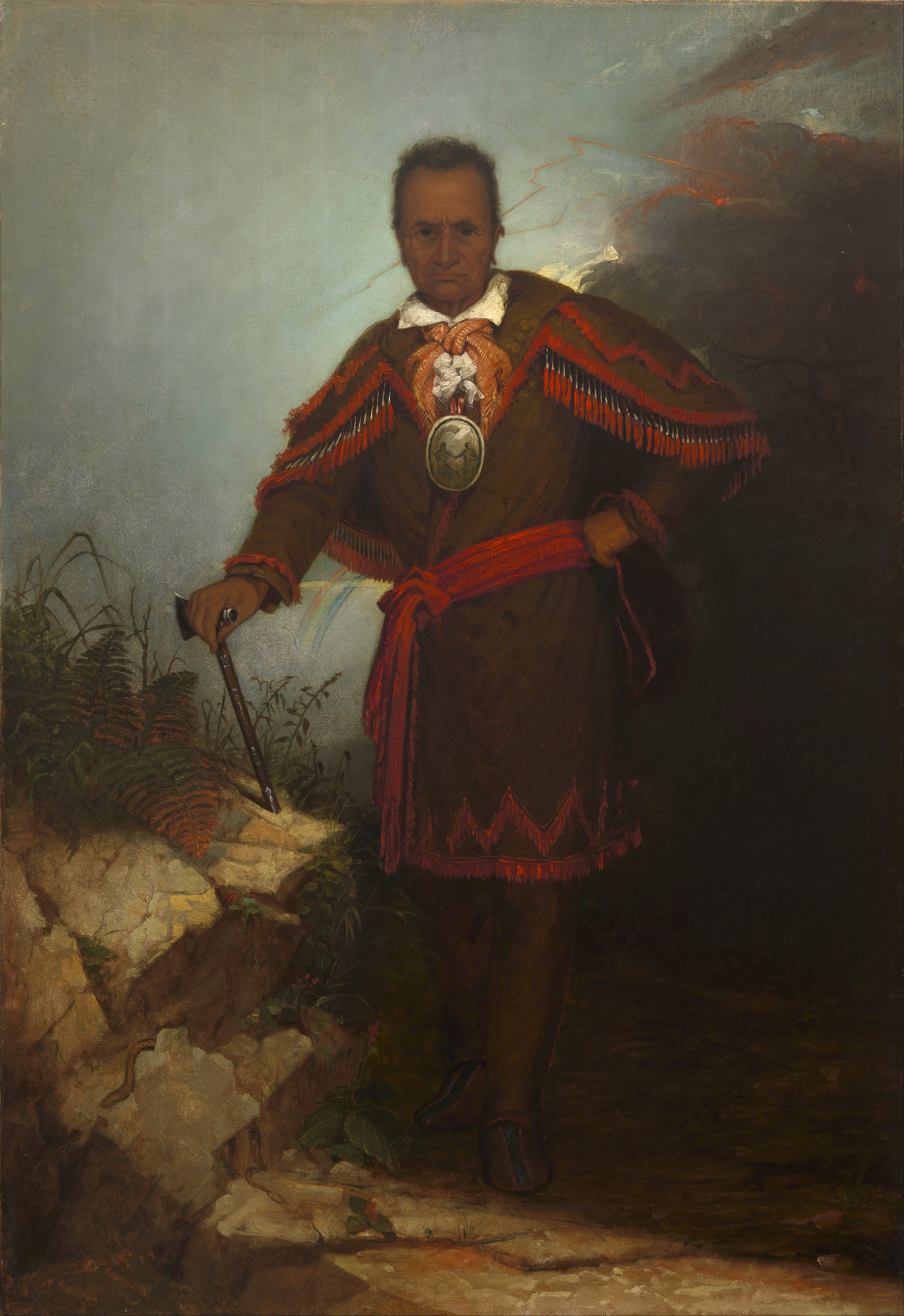
Portrait of Red Jacket (1868)

Thomas Hicks (October 18, 1823 – October 8, 1890) was an American painter.

== Biography ==
Hicks was born in Newtown, Bucks County, Pennsylvania and became a portrait painter, but is also known for genre works. He is known for his portrait of Abraham Lincoln that was engraved by Leopold Grozelier. He taught George Bernard Butler and Charles Henry Yewell. He studied with French painter Thomas Couture from 1848 to 1849.

He died on October 8, 1890.
