= Helmut and Katarina Kaltenegger =

Austrian entrepreneurs

Helmut Kaltenegger (born 23 December 1965) and Katarina Kaltenegger (born Katarina Kollarova, 16 April 1986) are Austrian entrepreneurs involved in prepaid forward contracts of gold. Financial market authorities of several countries have warned against investing or transferring any funds to their company, the TGI (formerly GGM Trading).

They were featured in the reality TV show "Die Kalteneggers" on Puls 4.

== Helmut Kaltenegger ==
Helmut Kaltenegger was a vacuum cleaner salesman for 20 years. In the 2010s, he founded and operated several companies which sold a variety of products:

His company AH Future promised extra income at no financial risk. Customers were offered to buy into becoming franchise partners, which allowed them to recruit new distribution partners for coffee and coffee machines themselves. The business was adjudged by an Austrian court to be an illegal pyramid scheme.

Another company of his sold wellness drinks for cardiac health, and a surface protection liquid for screens. The business was terminated following a bankruptcy proceeding.

== Gold business ==
Since 2018, the Kalteneggers have been operating a gold business which promises investors high discounts on future gold purchases. Financial market authorities of several countries have warned against investing or transferring any funds to their company.

=== GGM Trading ===
In 2018 Helmut Kalteneggers founded the GGMT (Green Gold Mine Trading) together with his future wife Katarina Kollarova. Investors were promised enormous discounts on future gold purchases, if they were willing to wait up to three years for their gold to be delivered.

A network marketing model incentivized customers to recruit more investors, often family and friends, with the promise of high commissions. The Kalteneggers used the money of their first customers to purchase more prestigious forms of advertisement and sponsored the Grasser Racing Team and the DSV Leoben.

Since 2019, negative reviews and blogs have warned against investing in the GGMT. As gold is exempt from financial regulations, gold businesses are poorly supervised by market authorities. While some investors received their gold deliveries on time, others were placated for months, or never received their gold or money back.

As more and more customers asked about delayed deliveries, the GGMT tried to skirt responsibility and in fall 2022 transferred all customers contracts to their business partner, the Aulicio mining company. Customers were then supposed to sign new contracts to get their money back in rates.

The Kalteneggers cut ties with Aulicio and continued their gold business with a new partner, the Gold Crest Refinery Ltd.

In 2024, Helmut and Katarina Kaltenegger and another business partner were indicted for fraud. The prosecution accused them to have defrauded 21,000 investors of 34.9 million euros.

In March 2025, all defendants were acquitted. A court appointed expert found it plausible that the COVID-19 pandemic and a 100-year flood in Guyana caused the Aulicio gold mine to cease operating, which delayed the gold deliveries. Since those circumstances could not have been foreseen, the accusations of intentional fraud could not be sustained.

=== TGI AG ===
In 2024, the Kalteneggers began to relocated the GGMT from Austria to Lichtenstein, where they continued their gold discount model under a new company name, the TGI (Trust Gold International).

The Financial Market Authority of Liechtenstein has "advised against making any investments in connection with the offering of TGI AG, in particular against responding to such offers or transferring any funds" and informed that the company "is not permitted to provide services requiring authorization or registration in Liechtenstein, for example the acceptance of deposits and other repayable funds (deposit business)."

The Financial Market Authority of Austria warned against offerings by the TGI, stating that it "is not authorised to accept funds from other parties on a commercial basis for management purposes or as deposits (deposit-taking business)."

In April 2026, the Federal Financial Supervisory Authority prohibited the TGI from offering capital investments to the public in Germany.

At the end of July 2026, the TGI stopped operating. As of August 2026, Liechtenstein prosecutors are investigating the TGI AG for suspected commercial aggravated fraud and money laundering. The company has denied the allegations.

News reported in September 2026 that sensitive data of tens of thousands of TGI customers had been leaked, including names, addresses, birth dates, telephone numbers and account numbers.

=== Trust Gold International ===
The Trust Gold International Ltd., located on Mauritius, replaced the TGI AG in August 2026. Customer were offered to transfer to the new company or to withdraw their funds. Around 2,800 customers who opted to withdraw their funds were not able to do so because payments were blocked by banks and government agencies, according to a TGI attorney.

== Personal life ==
Helmut Kaltenegger and Katarina Kollarova married in 2020.

The Puls 4 reality TV show "Die Kalteneggers – Eine Familie im Goldrausch" ("The Kalteneggers – a family gripped by gold fever") focused on the personal life of the couple.
