= Thermal grill illusion =

Sensory illusion

The thermal grill illusion (also known to researchers as the TGI) is a sensory illusion originally demonstrated in 1896 by the Swedish physician Torsten Thunberg. The illusion is created by a grill of bars which are alternately warm, e.g. 40 °C (104 °F; 313 K), and cool, e.g. 20 °C (68 °F; 293 K). When someone presses a hand against the whole grill, they experience the illusion of burning heat. But if they press against only a cool or a warm bar, only coolness or warmth, respectively, is experienced.

Researchers have used the illusion to demonstrate that burning pain sensation is in fact a mixture of both cold and heat pain and that it is only the inhibition of the cold pain "channel" that reveals the heat component.

The illusion is demonstrated by positioning the middle finger in cold water and the ring and index fingers in warm water. Due to shortcomings in the body map—the multisensory representation of the body—and this particular sensory input configuration, for some people the brain is tricked into thinking the middle finger is in the warm water and the index and ring fingers in cold water.

In an fMRI experiment of the illusion, researchers in 2011 observed an activation of the thalamus not seen for control stimuli. Also, activity in a portion of the right mid/anterior insula correlated with the perceived unpleasantness of the illusion.
