= George Bernard Butler =

American painter (1838–1907)

- Born: February 8, 1838
- Died: May 4, 1907 (aged 69)
- Education: studied under Thomas Hicks
- Style: portrait, genre, animal, and still life painting

George Bernard Butler Jr. (February 8, 1838 – May 4, 1907) was a portrait, genre, animal, and still life painter. Butler was born in New York City, where he studied art under Thomas Hicks.

In 1859 he went to Paris to study under Thomas Couture, then returned to serve in the military during the American Civil War. Despite the loss of his right arm, Butler continued his art career in New York and San Francisco, and was elected a National Academician in 1873. Two years later he returned to Europe and remained in Italy for an extended period.
