= Robert Emerson (scientist) =

American botanist (1903–1959)

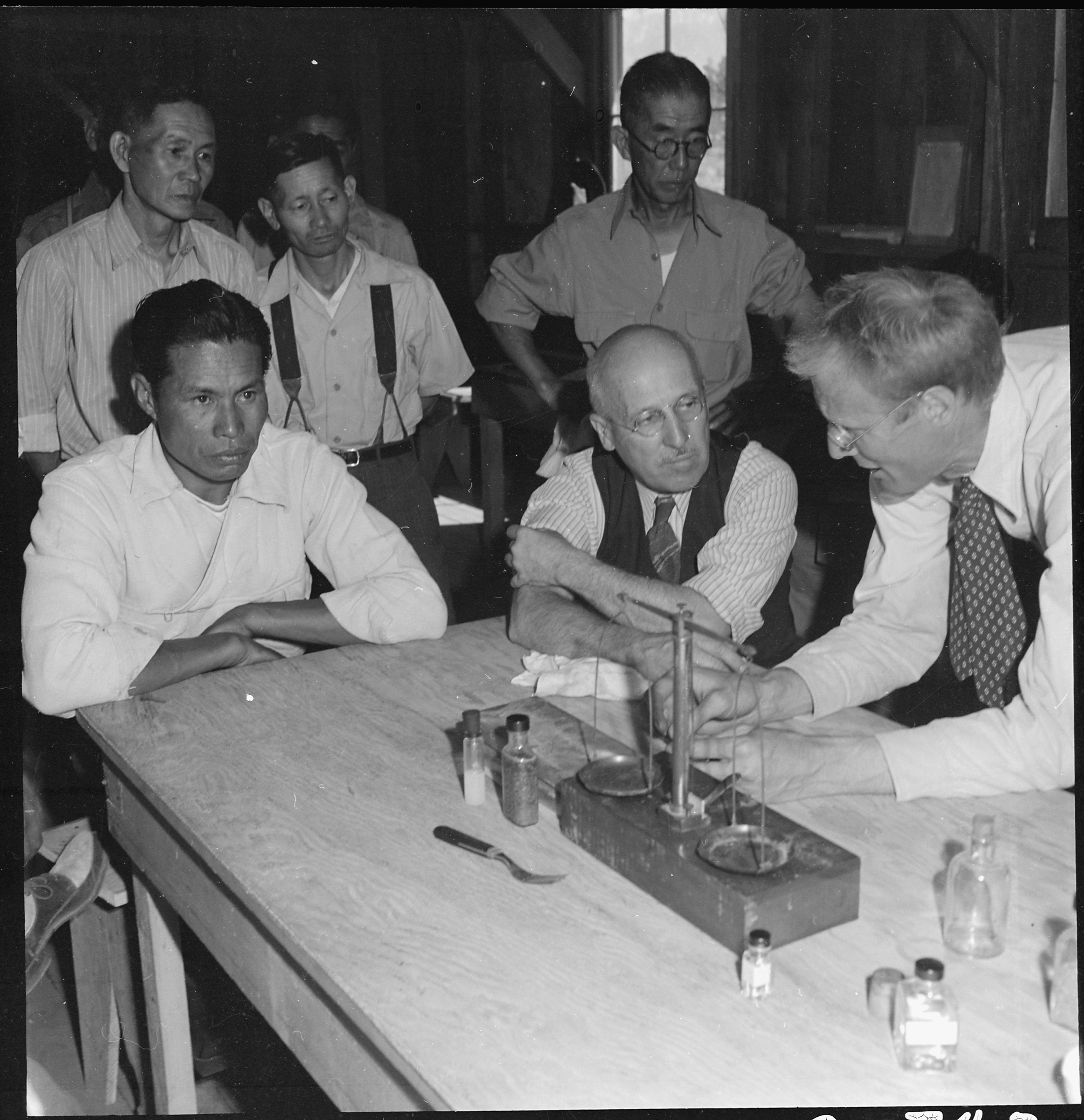
- Robert Emerson (right) explaining an experiment on June 28, 1942
- Born: November 4, 1903; New York City, New York, U.S.
- Died: February 4, 1959 (aged 55); New York City, New York, U.S.
- Education: Harvard University (MSc); University of Berlin (PhD)
- Known for: Emerson effect
- Spouse: Claire Garrison (m. 1927)
- Children: 4
- Father: Haven Emerson
- Relatives: John Haven Emerson (brother)
- Awards: Stephen Hales Prize (1949)
- Scientific career
- Fields: Botany; biochemistry
- Workplaces: University of Illinois; California Institute of Technology

Robert Emerson (November 4, 1903 – February 4, 1959) was an American botanist and biochemist who specialized in photosynthesis. He is best known for his discovery of the Emerson effect, a relation between light wavelengths and photosynthesis rates, and for identifying two distinct photosynthetic reaction centers in plants.

== Early life and education ==
Robert Emerson was born on November 4, 1903, in New York City. His parents were Haven Emerson, a physician, and Grace Parrish Emerson, the sister of Maxfield Parrish.

He received a master's degree in zoology from Harvard University in 1925 and a PhD in botany from the University of Berlin in 1927.

== Career ==
Thomas Hunt Morgan invited him to join the Biology Division at the California Institute of Technology, where he worked from 1930 to 1937, and again for a year in 1941 and 1945. From 1942 to 1945, he worked on producing rubber from the guayule shrub for the American Rubber Company.

In 1947, he moved to the Botany Department of the University of Illinois, where he remained for the rest of his life.

== Experimental results ==
Emerson's first significant result was the quantification of the ratio of chlorophyll molecules to oxygen molecules produced by photosynthesis. Emerson and William A. Arnold found that "the yield per flash reached a maximum when just 1 out of 2,500 chlorophylls absorbed a quantum".

Then, in 1939, Emerson demonstrated that between 8 and 12 quanta of light were needed to produce one molecule of oxygen. These results were controversial, as they contradicted Otto Warburg, who reported 4, then 3, and finally 2 quanta. This dispute was settled after the death of both men, and it is now agreed that Emerson was correct; the accepted modern value is 8–10 quanta.

In 1957, Emerson reported results now known as the Emerson effect: the increase in the rate of photosynthesis after chloroplasts are exposed to light of wavelength less than 680 nm (deep red spectrum) and more than 680 nm (far red spectrum). These results were later shown to be the first experimental demonstration that there are two photosynthetic reaction centers in plants.

== Personal life and death ==
Robert Emerson married Claire Garrison in 1927; they had three sons, Kenneth, Stephen, and David, and a daughter, Ruth. His brother was John Haven Emerson, an inventor known for his improvements to the iron lung. Robert and John were great-grandsons of the brother of the philosopher Ralph Waldo Emerson.

Robert Emerson died on February 4, 1959, from injuries sustained in the commercial airline flight crash of American Airlines Flight 320 in New York City, caused by faulty instruments, poor weather conditions, and crew inexperience with the aircraft.

== Honors and awards ==
Robert Emerson was awarded the Stephen Hales Prize of the American Society of Plant Physiologists in 1949, and he was elected a member of the National Academy of Sciences in 1953.
