= El Giral =

- Location within Panama
- Coordinates: 9°15′0″N 79°41′24″W
- Country: Panama
- Province: Colón

Population (2008)
  - Total: 1 460

El Giral is a town in the Colón province of Panama.

== Sources ==
- World Gazeteer: Panama – World-Gazetteer.com
