= Giralt =

Giralt is a Spanish surname. Notable people with the surname include:

- Armando Giralt (1885–1948), Cuban-born Spanish footballer
- Arnie David Giralt (born 1984), Cuban triple jumper
- David Giralt (1959–2020), Cuban long jumper
- Jaime Giralt (1902–1988), Spanish rower
- Jordán Vallmajo Giralt (1894–1983), Spanish wrestler
- José Giralt (1884–1960), Cuban-born Spanish footballer
- Juan Jané Giralt (born 1953), Spanish water polo player
- Marcos Giralt Torrente (born 1968), Spanish writer
- Mario Giralt (1882–?), Cuban-born Spanish footballer
- Ramón Power y Giralt (1775–1813), Spanish Navy officer and politician

The Georges Giralt PhD Award is a European scientific prize for extraordinary contributions to robotics.
