= Emerson effect =

Increase in the rate of photosynthesis after exposure to a certain light

The Emerson effect is the increase in the rate of photosynthesis after chloroplasts are exposed to light of wavelength less than 680 nm (deep red spectrum) and more than 680 nm (far red spectrum). When simultaneously exposed to light of both wavelengths, the rate of photosynthesis is higher than the sum of the red light and far red light photosynthesis rates. The effect was early evidence that two photosystems, processing different wavelengths, cooperate in photosynthesis.

== History ==
Robert Emerson described the eponymous effect in 1957. In his paper he observed that:

1. When plants are exposed to light having wavelength greater than 680 nm, then only one photosystem is activated; i.e. PS700 resulting in formation of ATP only.
2. When plants are exposed to light having wavelength less than 680 nm, the rate of photosynthesis was very low.
3. On giving both shorter and higher wavelengths of light, the efficiency of the process increased, because both photosystems were working together at the same time, resulting in higher yield.

== Description ==
When Emerson exposed green plants to differing wavelengths of light, he noticed that at wavelengths of greater than 680 nm the efficiency of photosynthesis decreased abruptly despite the fact that this is a region of the spectrum where chlorophyll still absorbs light (chlorophyll is the green pigment in plants - it absorbs mainly the red and blue wavelengths from light). When the plants were exposed to short-wavelength light, (less than 660 nm), the efficiency also decreased. Emerson then exposed the plants to both short and long wavelengths at the same time, causing the efficiency to increase greatly. He concluded that there must be two different photosystems involved in photosynthesis, one driven by short-wavelength light and one driven by long-wavelength (PS1 and PS2). They work together to enhance efficiency and convert the light energy to forms that can be absorbed by the plant.

The light excites the chlorophyll molecules at the reaction centre and causes an increase in energy. As the molecule becomes less excited, its energy is transported through a chain of electron carriers to the next photosystem which does much the same thing and produces energy-carrying organic molecules.
