= Burr (surname) =

Burr is a British and German surname. In English language it possibly originates from bur, a seed or dry fruit that has hooks or teeth, while in German it is a topographic name derived from burr(e), meaning a hill or a mound. Notable people with the surname include:

- Aaron Burr (1756–1836), third U.S. vice president
- Aaron Burr Sr. (1716–1757), American Presbyterian minister and college educator
- Alice Burr (1883–1968), American photographer
- Amelia Josephine Burr (1878–1968), American poet
- Albert G. Burr (1829–1882), American politician
- Benjamin Burr (1818–1894), American politician
- Bill Burr (born 1968), American stand-up comedian and actor
- Chandler Burr (born 1963), American journalist and author
- Claudia Burr (born 1968), Chilean actress
- Clive Burr (1957–2013), English drummer
- David H. Burr (1803–1875), American cartographer and surveyor
- Esther Edwards Burr (1732–1758), wife of Aaron Burr Sr.
- Frances Burr (1890–1974), American artist
- Frances Ellen Burr (1831–1923), American suffragist
- Frank A. Burr (1843–1894), American newspaper reporter and author
- George Dominicus Burr, surveyor, after whom Mount Burr, South Australia was named (father of Thomas Burr)
- George Elbert Burr (1859–1939), American painter and printmaker
- George Frederick Burr (1819–1857), English cricketer and priest
- George Lincoln Burr (1857–1938), American historian
- Harold Saxton Burr (1889–1973), American anatomist
- Jeff Burr (1963–2023), American movie actor, scenarist and producer
- John Burr (1831–1893), Scottish painter
- John Pierre Burr (1792–1864), American abolitionist
- Lachlan Burr (born 1992), Australian rugby league footballer
- Malcolm Burr (1878–1954), English entomologist
- Raymond Burr (1917–1993), Canadian-American actor
- Richard Burr (born 1955), American businessman and senator from North Carolina
- Robert N. Burr (1916–2014), American historian
- Smith Burr (1803–1887), American horse breeder and hotelier
- Shawn Burr (1966–2013), Canadian ice hockey player
- Tanya Burr (born 1989), English vlogger and blogger
- Theodore Burr (1771-1822/24), American inventor of the Burr Truss
- Theodosia Burr Alston (1783–1813), née Burr, daughter of American politician Aaron Burr
- Thomas Burr (1813–1866), Deputy Surveyor General of South Australia 1839–46

== See also ==
- Buer (disambiguation)
- Burr (disambiguation)
