= Peter Christopher =

Peter Christopher may refer to:

- Peter Christopher (American author) (1956–2008), American author and academic
- Peter Christopher (Australian author) (born 1948), Australian author and photographer who writes about shipwrecks and riverboats
