= List of shipwrecks in January 1880 =

The list of shipwrecks in January 1880 includes ships sunk, foundered, grounded, or otherwise lost during January 1880.

== 1 January ==
List of shipwrecks: 1 January 1880
| Ship | State | Description |
|---|---|---|
| Constance | United Kingdom | The ship ran aground at King's Lynn, Norfolk. She was on a voyage from Pensacola, Florida to King's Lynn. |
| Cyrenian | United Kingdom | The steamship ran aground in the Dardanelles. She was on a voyage from Liverpool, Lancashire to Constantinople, Ottoman Empire. She was refloated on 3 January and resumed her voyage. |
| Dart | United Kingdom | The schooner was driven ashore at Ballynass, County Londonderry. She was refloated. |
| Ferda | Norway | The barque ran aground on the Teufelsbrake and sank. Her crew survived. . |
| George Bell | United Kingdom | The ship was holed by ice at Bremen, Germany and was beached. |
| Jeune Narcisse | France | The ship collided with the barque Emma (Netherlands) and sank in the English Channel off Dungeness, Kent, United Kingdom. Her crew were rescued by Emma. Jeune Narcisse was on a voyage from Bordeaux, Gironde to Abbeville, Somme. |
| Maid | United Kingdom | The barque caught fire and sank in the Atlantic Ocean with the loss of all hands. |
| North Carolina | United Kingdom | The iron hulled bark ran aground was wrecked on a reef 8.5 N.M south west of Gibbs Hill Lighthouse, Bermuda. |
| Rumney | United Kingdom | The steamship ran aground in the Gironde. She was on a voyage from Newport, Monmouthshire to Bordeaux. She was refloated. |
| Troubador | United Kingdom | The ship was wrecked on Iona, Inner Hebrides. Her six crew survived. |
| Tryphena | United Kingdom | The ship ran aground at Runcorn, Cheshire. She was on a voyage from Dunkirk, Nord to Runcorn. She was refloated. |

== 2 January ==
List of shipwrecks: 2 January 1880
| Ship | State | Description |
|---|---|---|
| Atlante | Germany | The ship capsized in the Baltic Sea off the coast of Sweden with the loss of all hands. |
| Amcott or Amholt | United Kingdom | The steamship ran aground on the Middle Cross Sand, in the North Sea off the coast of Norfolk. She was on a voyage from Dunkirk, Nord to the River Tyne. She was refloated and resumed her voyage. |
| Charles T. Elwell | United Kingdom | The barque departed from New Orleans, Louisiana, United States for Rouen, Seine-Inférieure, France. No further trace, presumed foundered with the loss of all fifteen people on board. |
| Cleanthes | United Kingdom | The steamship was run into by the steamship Bengore (United Kingdom) and sank in the River Thames at Greenwich, Kent. Cleanthes was on a voyage from Newcastle upon Tyne, Northumberland to London. She was refloated on 7 January. |
| Elcano | United Kingdom | The ship was driven ashore at Chicken Head, Isle of Lewis, Outer Hebrides. She broke up on 28 January. |
| Eleanor Jane | Canada | The ship was driven ashore and wrecked at "Balls Bluff". |
| Faid Rabani | United Kingdom | The brig struck a rock off Coquet Island, Northumberland and sank. Her crew were rescued. She was being towed from Berwick upon Tweed, Northumberland to South Shields, County Durham. |
| Karen Bothilde | Denmark | The ship foundered in the Baltic Sea off the coast of Sweden with the loss of all hands. |
| Madoya | Canada | The schooner was driven ashore and wrecked on Grand Menan, Nova Scotia. |
| Marie Leonie | United Kingdom | The schooner was beached at Greencastle, County Antrim. She was on a voyage from Londonderry to Bowling, Dunbartonshire. |
| Pearl | United Kingdom | The schooner was wrecked on the Medulse Rocks, off Inchcolm, Fife. Her crew were rescued. |
| St. Nicholas | United Kingdom | The barque was driven ashore at Zandvoort, North Holland, Netherlands. She was on a voyage from New York, United States to Rotterdam, South Holland, Netherlands. She was destroyed by fire the next day. |
| Thetis | United Kingdom | The ship was taken in to Langesund, Norway in a capsized condition. She was on a voyage from a Baltic port to Sunderland, County Durham. |

== 3 January ==
List of shipwrecks: 3 January 1880
| Ship | State | Description |
|---|---|---|
| Bee | United Kingdom | The smack capsized off Whitehead, County Antrim. Her three crew survived. |
| Benace | United Kingdom | The steamship was driven ashore at "Punta Fe Resena", Austria-Hungary. |
| Derwent | United Kingdom | The steamship ran aground at Sunderland, County Durham. She was refloated with the assistance of four tugs. |
| Eunomia | United Kingdom | The ship ran aground near Goole, Yorkshire. She was on a voyage from Jamaica to Goole. She was refloated. |
| Formosa | United States | The full-rigged ship struck a rock and sank in the Alas Strait. Her crew were rescued by the steamship William Mackinnon (United Kingdom). Formosa was on a voyage from the Spanish East Indies to Boston, Massachusetts. |
| Geertina | Netherlands | The brig ran aground at Makassar, Netherlands East Indies and was beached at "Maloangin". Her crew were rescued. |
| Maritime Union | Belgium | The ship ran aground on the Ruytiegen Bank. She was on a voyage from Lobos to Antwerp. She was refloated and resumed her voyage. |
| Mary | United Kingdom | The schooner was driven ashore and wrecked near the Tarbat Ness Lighthouse, Ross-shire. She was on a voyage from Portmahomack, Ross-shire to Fort William, Inverness-shire. |
| Prairie | New Zealand | The brig was driven and wrecked ashore at the entrance to Kaipara Harbour |
| Rathmore | United Kingdom | The steamship departed from Cardiff, Glamorgan for Bombay, India. Presumed subsequently foundered in the Mediterranean Sea with the loss of all 32 crew; lifebuoys from the ship washed up on Malta on 8 and 25 February. |
| Senator | Denmark | The schooner was driven ashore on Læsø. She was on a voyage from Leith, Lothian, United Kingdom to Flensburg, Germany. She was refloated and taken in to Fredrikshald, Norway. |
| Spanker | United States | The ship was driven ashore in the Buttermilk Channel. She was on a voyage from Pernambuco, Brazil to New York. |
| St. Louis | France | The barque collided with a steamship and sank in the Irish Sea 18 nautical miles (33 km) west south west of the South Stack, Anglesey, United Kingdom. Her fourteen crew were rescued by the steamship William Griffiths (United Kingdom). St. Louis was on a voyage from the Black River to Liverpool, Lancashire, United Kingdom. |
| Strelna | United Kingdom | The steamship was driven ashore in the Scheldt near Baarland, Zeeland, Netherlands. She broke in two and was a total loss. Her crew were rescued. She was on a voyage from Riga, Russia to Antwerp, Belgium. She was refloated in mid-February and towed in to Antwerp. |
| Unnamed | Austria-Hungary | The ship foundered off Rethymno, Crete with the loss of all thirteen crew. |

== 4 January ==
List of shipwrecks: 4 January 1880
| Ship | State | Description |
|---|---|---|
| Banshee | United Kingdom | The schooner sank in the Gare Loch. She was refloated on 11 January and taken in to Greenock, Renfrewshire for repairs. |
| Euphony | United Kingdom | The barque was damaged by fire at Liverpool, Lancashire. |
| Kate | United Kingdom | The schooner was wrecked on the Shipwash Sand, in the North Sea off the coast of Suffolk. Her five crew survived. She was on a voyage from Sunderland, County Durham to Great Yarmouth, Norfolk. |
| Lioness | United Kingdom | The barque ran aground in the River Tees. She was on a voyage from Baltimore, Maryland, United States to Stockton-on-Tees, County Durham. She was refloated the next day and taken in to Stockton-on-Tees. |
| Maria Salome | Spain | The barque was abandoned in the Atlantic Ocean. Her crew were rescued by the barque Camponeza (Portugal). Maria Salome was on a voyage from Manzanilla, Trinidad to Falmouth, Cornwall, United Kingdom. |
| Osmo | (Russian Empire) Grand Duchy of Finland | The ship was driven ashore at Folkestone, Kent, United Kingdom. She was on a voyage from Calais, France to Baltimore, Maryland, United States. She was refloated with the assistance of four tugs and towed in to Dover, Kent. |
| Queen of Mistley | United Kingdom | The schooner was driven ashore and wrecked on Terschelling, Friesland, Netherlands. Her seven crew were rescued. She was on a voyage from Laguna, Brazil to Harburg, Germany. She was refloated on 12 January and towed in to Harburg. |
| Unnamed | United Kingdom | The steamship was wrecked off Andros, Greece. |

== 5 January ==
List of shipwrecks: 5 January 1880
| Ship | State | Description |
|---|---|---|
| Alcyon | France | The steamship struck a rock and was run ashore near "Agle". She was on a voyage from Marseille, Bouches-du-Rhône to Nantes, Loire-Inférieure. |
| Benguela | United Kingdom | The steamship ran aground on the Long Reef, at the mouth of the Gambia River. She was on a voyage from Liverpool, Lancashire to Bathurst, Gambia Colony and Protectorate. She was refloated and taken in to Bathurst for repairs. |
| Florence May | United Kingdom | The fishing smack was driven ashore at Coveness, Suffolk. She was refloated with assistance from the tug Dispatch (United Kingdom) and taken in to Lowestoft, Suffolk. |
| Grietje | Sweden | The ship was damaged by ice and was towed in to Landskrona in a severely leaky condition. |
| Highmoor | United Kingdom | The barque ran aground in the Zuidergat. She was on a voyage from Philadelphia, Pennsylvania, United States to Antwerp, Belgium. She was refloated the next day with the assistance of six tugs and taken in to Antwerp. |
| Osmo Romo | Flag unknown | The ship ran aground on the Copt Rocks. She was refloated. |
| Valdemar | Denmark | The steamship ran aground at Maassluis, South Holland, Netherlands. She was on a voyage from Riga, Russia to Rotterdam, South Holland. She was refloated. |

== 6 January ==
List of shipwrecks: 6 January 1880
| Ship | State | Description |
|---|---|---|
| Adela | Flag unknown | The ship was driven ashore in a capsized condition in a storm in Western Australia. |
| Aldborough | United Kingdom | The steamship was driven ashore near Calais, France. |
| Alpha | Flag unknown | The ship was wrecked in a storm in Western Australia. |
| Altyre | United Kingdom | The steamship ran aground on the Sow and Pigs Rocks, off the coast of Northumberland. She was refloated. |
| Banangara | Flag unknown | The ship was wrecked in a storm in Western Australia. |
| Banner | United Kingdom | The ship ran aground on Dod's Bank, in the River Carron. She was on a voyage from Pensacola, Florida, United States to Grangemouth, Stirlingshire. |
| Charity | United Kingdom | The brig ran aground at Maassluis, South Holland, Netherlands. She was on a voyage from Lisbon, Portugal to Maassluis. |
| Dawn | Flag unknown | The schooner was feared to have foundered in the Flying Foam Passage, off the coast of Western Australia, in a storm. |
| Emma | Flag unknown | The ship was damaged in a storm in Western Australia. |
| Ethel | Flag unknown | The ship sank in a storm in Western Australia. |
| Florence | Flag unknown | The ship capsized in a storm in Western Australia with the loss of a crew member. |
| Fortescue | Flag unknown | The ship was wrecked in a storm in Western Australia. |
| Kate | Flag unknown | The ship capsized in a storm in Western Australia. |
| Mary Elizabeth | United Kingdom | The schooner collided with the brig Salisbury (United Kingdom) and was abandoned in the Bristol Channel off Breaksea Point, Glamorgan. Her crew were rescued. Mary Elizabeth was on a voyage from Newport, Monmouthshire to Caen, Calvados, France. She came ashore at Nash Point, Glamorgan. |
| Morning Star | Flag unknown | The ship foundered in a storm in Western Australia with the loss of her owner. |
| Nautilus | Flag unknown | The ship was damaged in a storm in Western Australia. |
| Sally | United Kingdom | The barque sprang a leak and was abandoned in the Atlantic Ocean. Her twenty crew were rescued by the barque Ernesto Parodi (Italy). Sally was on a voyage from Saint John's, Newfoundland Colony to Greenock, Renfrewshire. |
| Sarah | Flag unknown | The ship was driven ashore in a storm in Western Australia. |
| Scottish Knight | United Kingdom | The ship sprang a leak and was beached off the Sandy Cape, Queensland and was consequently beached at Gladstone, Queensland. She was on a voyage from Rockhampton, Queensland to London. |
| Uhlenhorst | Germany | The steamship collided with the steamship Argentina (Germany) and sank at Hamburg. Uhlenhorst was on a voyage from Hartlepool, County Durham, United Kingdom to Hambugrg. |
| Verity | Canada | The barque was driven ashore and wrecked at Cleggan, County Galway, United Kingdom. Her crew were rescued. She was on a voyage from Waterford, United Kingdom to Sandy Hook, New Jersey, United States. The wreck was plundered by the local inhabitants. |
| Yule | Flag unknown | The ship was damaged in a storm in Western Australia. |

== 7 January ==
List of shipwrecks: 7 January 1880
| Ship | State | Description |
|---|---|---|
| Arlington | United States | The ship ran aground in the Elbe. |
| Bosphorus | United Kingdom | The ship ran aground on the Scroby Sands, in the North Sea off the coast of Norfolk. She was on a voyage from South Shields, County Durham to Cowes, Isle of Wight. She was refloated and towed in to Great Yarmouth, Norfolk. |
| Colina | United Kingdom | The steamship ran aground on the Goodwin Sands, Kent. She was on a voyage from Hull, Yorkshire to Newport, Monmouthshire. She was refloated and resumed her voyage. |
| Dagmar | Denmark | The brig sprang a leak and foundered off the Paternosters with the loss of five of her seven crew. Survivors were rescued by Aderton Syskon (Sweden). Dagmar was on a voyage from Newcastle upon Tyne, Northumberland, United Kingdom to Nyborg. |
| Emily | United Kingdom | The steamship was driven ashore near Bo'ness, Lothian. |
| George and Mary | United Kingdom | The smack was abandoned at sea. Her four crew were rescued by the steamship Othello (United Kingdom). |
| Honor | Austria-Hungary | The barque was driven ashore near Pola. She was on a voyage from New York, United States to Trieste. She was later refloated and resumed her voyage. |
| Jane | United Kingdom | The schooner was driven ashore at New Romney, Kent. She was on a voyage from London to Swansea, Glamorgan. |
| John Bladworth, and William Coulman | United Kingdom | The steamship collided in the River Ouse at Swinefleet, East Riding of Yorkshire and were both severely damaged. John Bladworth was on a voyage from Terneuzen, Zeeland, Netherlands to Goole, Yorkshire. William Coulman was on a voyage from Goole to Rotterdam, South Holland. Both vessels were taken in to Goole for repairs. |
| Jubilee | United Kingdom | The steamship ran aground on the Newcombe Sand, in the North Sea off the coast of Suffolk. She was on a voyage from Dunkirk, Nord, France to Burntisland, Fife. She was refloated and resumed her voyage. |
| Lühe | Germany | The ship ran aground in the Elbe. She was on a voyage from Philadelphia, Pennsylvania, United States to Hamburg. She was later refloated with the assistance of a tug and resumed her voyage. |
| Maira Dunan | United Kingdom | The barque was abandoned in the Atlantic Ocean (42°24′N 43°36′W). Her crew were rescued by the steamship Columbia (United Kingdom). Maria Dunan was on a voyage from Boston, Massachusetts, United States to Ipswich, Suffolk. |
| North Star | United Kingdom | The full-rigged ship departed from Pensacola, Florida for Swansea. No further trace, presumed foundered with the loss of all 25 crew. |
| Northumbria | United Kingdom | The barque was destroyed by fire at Bremerhaven, Germany. She was on a voyage from Banana, Congo Free State to Rotterdam. |
| Unity | Canada | The barque was driven ashore at Clifden, County Galway, United Kingdom with the loss of three of her crew. |

== 8 January ==
List of shipwrecks: 8 January 1880
| Ship | State | Description |
|---|---|---|
| Alice Lea | United States | The brigantine was driven ashore and wrecked on the coast of Virginia 3 1/2 nautical miles (6.5 km) south of Life Saving Station No. 8, 5th District. Her nine crew were rescued by the United States Life Saving Service. Most of her cargo was salvaged by a wrecking company. One wrecking company employee drowned on 23 January when a boat was swamped. |
| Emulator | United Kingdom | The ship was driven ashore 4 nautical miles (7.4 km) west of Newhaven, Sussex. She was on a voyage from Gallipoli, Ottoman Empire to Goole, Yorkshire. |
| Gazelle | United Kingdom | The brig collided with the steamship Hamsteel (United Kingdom) and sank in the River Thames at Gravesend, Kent. Her crew were rescued. |
| Henry Ismay | United Kingdom | The ship was run down by the steamship Duke of Argyle (United Kingdom) and sank off the Copeland Islands, County Down with the loss of a crew member. Henry Ismay was on a voyage from Ayr to Dublin. |
| Nene | United Kingdom | The brig was wrecked at Garwick, Isle of Man with the loss of four of her five crew. She was on a voyage from Whitehaven, Cumberland to Douglas, Isle of Man. |
| Stephenson | United Kingdom | The steamship ran aground at Goeree, Zeeland, Netherlands. She was on a voyage from Reval, Russia to Rotterdam, South Holland, Netherlands. She was refloated with assistance from tugs. |

== 9 January ==
List of shipwrecks: 9 January 1880
| Ship | State | Description |
|---|---|---|
| Elizabeth Kelly | United Kingdom | The smack was driven ashore at Margate, Kent. She was on a voyage from Middlesbrough, Yorkshire to Bristol, Gloucestershire. She was refloated and resumed her voyage. |
| Fanny | United Kingdom | The schooner was run down and sunk off Queenstown, County Cork by the steamship Bavarian (United Kingdom) with the loss of three of her four crew. Fanny was on a voyage from Cardiff, Glamorgan to Cork. |
| Leversous | United Kingdom | The steamship ran aground in the River Tyne. She was on a voyage from South Shields, County Durham to London. She was refloated and put back to South Shields. |
| Madeira | Canada | The schooner capsized, was driven ashore and was wrecked off Green Point, Maine, 1 nautical mile (1.9 km) west of the Passamaquoddy Light. Her five crew were rescued by the United States Life Saving Service. Some equipment was salvaged. |
| Regulus | United Kingdom | The steamship was damaged by fire at Newport, Monmouthshire. |

== 10 January ==
List of shipwrecks: 10 January 1880
| Ship | State | Description |
|---|---|---|
| British Envoya | United Kingdom | The ship was driven ashore in the Crosby Channel. She was on a voyage from San Francisco, California, United States to Liverpool, Lancashire. |
| Congo | France | The steamship ran aground in the Gironde. She was on a voyage from the River Plate to Bordeaux, Gironde. |
| Elizabeth and Ann | United Kingdom | The steam wherry was driven ashore at Amble, Northumberland. She was on a voyage from Sunderland, County Durham to Dundee, Forfarshire. She was refloated the next day and resumed her voyage. |
| Finistère | France | The steamship was wrecked on the Île d'Oléron, Morbihan. |
| Forest Princess | United Kingdom | The ship was driven ashore at Falmouth, Cornwall. She was refloated with assistance from tugs. |
| Hartlepool | United Kingdom | The steamship ran aground at Maryport, Cumberland. She was on a voyage from Santander, Spain to Maryport. She was refloated and taken in to Maryport in a leaky condition. |
| Henrietta | Netherlands | The schooner ran aground at "Fenedo", Brazil. She was on a voyage from Rotterdam, South Holland to "Fenedo". She was refloated and found to be leaky. |
| Hesperus | United Kingdom | The dandy was driven ashore and wrecked at St. Ives, Cornwall. She was on a voyage from Liverpool, Lancashire to Calstock, Cornwall. |
| John and Ann | United Kingdom | The schooner was driven ashore on an island in the Larne Lough. She was on a voyage from Portmadoc, Caernarfonshire to Londonderry. |
| Otto | Norway | The barque departed from Greenock, Renfrewshire, United Kingdom for Saint John, New Brunswick, Canada. No further trace, presumed foundered with the loss of all hands. |
| Palmyra | United Kingdom | The steamship ran aground in the Dardanelles. She was on a voyage from Cardiff, Glamorgan to Sevastopol, Russia. She was refloated with assistance and resumed her voyage. |
| Salvador | Spain | The ship was wrecked on Inagua, Bahamas. She was on a voyage from Santa Cruz, Cuba to Falmouth, Cornwall. |
| Sea View | United Kingdom | The schooner ran aground on the Castle Rocks, in Wicklow Bay. She was refloated the next day. |
| Urania | United Kingdom | The steamship foundered in the Irish Sea 7 nautical miles (13 km) west by north of Fleetwood, Lancashire. Her crew were rescued by the schooner Golden Island (United Kingdom). Urania was on a voyage from Barrow-in-Furness to Liverpool. |

== 11 January ==
List of shipwrecks: 11 January 1880
| Ship | State | Description |
|---|---|---|
| Ada M. Hallock | United States | The schooner struck the Hog Island Shoals, off the coast of Virginia and then drifted ashore 1 1/2 nautical miles (2.8 km) south east of Life Saving Station No. 9, 5th District. Her four crewmen were rescued by the United States Life Saving Service She subsequently broke up. |
| Hesperus | United Kingdom | The ketch was driven ashore at Battery Point under St Ives Head Cornwall, England. She was on a voyage from Liverpool, Lancashire to Calstock, Cornwall. All four crew were rescued. |
| Maynards | United Kingdom | The brig was driven ashore on Rügen, Germany. She was on a voyage from Memel, Germany to London. |
| Robert and James | United Kingdom | The Thames barge collided with the Thames barge Pinta (United Kingdom) and sank at Northfleet, Kent. She was on a voyage form London to Maidstone, Kent. |
| Sultan | United Kingdom | The steamship collided with the steamship Durham at Hull, Yorkshire and was severely damaged. She was consequently beached. |
| Troubador | United Kingdom | The steamship ran aground in the Clyde. She was refloated. |
| Two unnamed vessels | Italy; Flag unknown | ~A steamship and a sailing ship collided in the Gulf of Smyrna. Both vessels sank with the loss of all hands. |

== 12 January ==
List of shipwrecks: 12 January 1880
| Ship | State | Description |
|---|---|---|
| Brilliant | United Kingdom | The ship was driven ashore. She was on a voyage from Roscoff, Finistère, France to Bristol, Gloucestershire. She was refloated and taken in to Aberthaw, Glamorgan. |
| Cossack | United Kingdom | The steamship ran aground in the Humber at Paull Yorkshire. She was on a voyage from Hull, Yorkshire, to Königsberg, Germany. She was refloated and put back to Hull. |
| Fame | United Kingdom | The schooner ran aground at Maassluis, South Holland, Netherlands and was severely damaged. She was on a voyage from Rotterdam, South Holland to London. She was refloated and put back to Rotterdam in a severely leaky condition, but consequently sank near Maassluis. |
| Fanny Atkinson | United Kingdom | The barque ran aground on the Shoals Patch in the Clyde. She was refloated and resumed her voyage. |
| Nazarino | Italy | The ship collided with the steamship Trinacria (United Kingdom) at Genoa and was beached. Her crew were rescued. |
| Philia | United Kingdom | The ship was driven ashore in Mossel Bay. Her crew were rescued. |
| Regina | Italy | The ship ran aground. She was refloated and towed in to Cuxhaven, Germany. |
| Riga | United Kingdom | The steamship was severely damaged by fire at West Hartlepool, County Durham. |

== 13 January ==
List of shipwrecks: 13 January 1880
| Ship | State | Description |
|---|---|---|
| Areta | United Kingdom | The ship was driven ashore at Sainte-Marie-la-Mer, Pyrénées-Orientales, France. She was on a voyage from Cagliari, Sardinia, Italy to Port Vendres, Pyrénées-Orientales. |
| Flying Mist | United Kingdom | The paddle tug ran ashore near Marsden, County Durham and was severely damaged. She was refloated and taken in to South Shields. Subsequently repaired and returned to service. |
| Kinghorn | United Kingdom | The steamship was driven ashore at Zandvoort, North Holland, Netherlands. She was on a voyage from Antwerp, Belgium to Amsterdam, North Holland. She was refloated and taken in to IJmuiden, North Holland. |
| Ranger | United Kingdom | The steamship was run into by the steamship Maindee Park and sank in the River Usk. Ranger was on a voyage from Newport, Monmouthshire to Waterford. |
| Riga | United Kingdom | The steamship was damaged by fire at Hartlepool, County Durham. |
| Swift | United Kingdom | The schooner was driven ashore in Sandside Bay. Her crew survived. She was on a voyage from Liverpool, Lancashire to Newcastle upon Tyne, Northumberland. |
| Texas | United Kingdom | The steamship ran aground on the Florida Reef. She was refloated. |
| Union | Germany | The full-rigged ship was run into and sunk by the steamship Sandsend (United Kingdom) off St. Catherine's Point, Isle of Wight, United Kingdom. Her crew were rescued. |

== 14 January ==
List of shipwrecks: 14 January 1880
| Ship | State | Description |
|---|---|---|
| Aios Kircos | Greece | The brig was driven ashore at Tripoli, Ottoman Tripolitania. Her crew were rescued. |
| Demetrius | Greece | The brig was driven ashore at Tripoli. Her crew were rescued. |
| Due Fratelli | Italy | The brig was wrecked at Termini. Her crew were rescued. |
| Lord Ashburton | United Kingdom | The full-rigged ship was driven ashore at Tripoli. Her eleven crew were rescued. |
| Marchioness of Londonderry | United Kingdom | The steamship was driven ashore at the mouth of the River Tees. She was on a voyage from Bilbao, Spain to Middlesbrough, Yorkshire. |
| Marion | United Kingdom | The steamship ran aground on the Englishman's Shoal, in the Dardanelles. She was refloated. |
| Sardonyx | United Kingdom | The steamship collided with the steamship Ethiopia (United Kingdom) and sank in the Clyde. |
| Sjælland | Denmark | The barque was driven ashore at Tripoli. Her crew were rescued. |
| Thornbury | United Kingdom | The steamship was driven ashore at the mouth of the River Tees. She was on a voyage from Bilbao to Middlesbrough. |

== 15 January ==
List of shipwrecks: 15 January 1880
| Ship | State | Description |
|---|---|---|
| Hockfield | Germany | The steamship was driven ashore near Lydd, Kent, United Kingdom. She was refloated and resumed her voyage. |
| Mary Ann | United Kingdom | The schooner was wrecked at Peterhead, Aberdeenshire. Her four crew survived. She was on a voyage from Sunderland, County Durham to Peterhead. |
| Pleuvre | United Kingdom | The smack was lost off Tramore, County Waterford. Her crew were rescued. |
| Una | United Kingdom | The ship departed from Roscoff, Finistère, France for Shoreham-by-Sea, Sussex. No further trace, reported missing. |

== 16 January ==
List of shipwrecks: 16 January 1880
| Ship | State | Description |
|---|---|---|
| Charles | France | The ship damaged by fire at New Orleans, Louisiana, United States. |
| Express | United Kingdom | The ship was driven ashore and wrecked near Cushendall, County Antrim. She was on a voyage from Red Bay, County Antrim to Workington, Cumberland. |
| Ethiopia | United Kingdom | The steamship ran aground in the Clyde. She was refloated the next day. |
| Greece | United Kingdom | The steamship was damaged by an explosion in her coal bunker at New York, United States. Two crew were killed and nine were injured. She was on a voyage from Liverpool, Lancashire to New York. |
| Mikado | United Kingdom | The steamship ran aground in the Clyde. She was refloated the next day. |

== 17 January ==
List of shipwrecks: 17 January 1880
| Ship | State | Description |
|---|---|---|
| Annie Mark | United Kingdom | The barque was wrecked on Klein Curaçao, Curaçao and Dependencies. Her crew were rescued. |
| Kirstine | Denmark | The schooner ran aground on the Goodwin Sands, Kent, United Kingdom. She was on a voyage from Gioia Tauro, Italy to Goole, Yorkshire, United Kingdom. She was refloated and taken in to Ramsgate, Kent. |

== 18 January ==
List of shipwrecks: 18 January 1880
| Ship | State | Description |
|---|---|---|
| Albion | United Kingdom | The Yorkshire billyboy ran aground on the Haisborough Sands, in the North Sea off the coast of Norfolk. She was refloated but consequently foundered off Great Yarmouth, Norfolk. All on board survived. She was on a voyage from Hull, Yorkshire to Dartford, Kent. |
| Etje | Germany | The schooner was driven ashore at Lydd, Kent, United Kingdom. Her crew were rescued by rocket apparatus. She was on a voyage from Brake to Tarragona, Spain. |
| Rotterdam | Netherlands | The steamship ran aground in the Elbe. She was Porto, Portugal to Hamburg, Germany. She was refloated the next day with the assistance on an icebreaker. |
| Thomas Turnbull | United Kingdom | The barque ran aground on the Sheringham Shoal, in the North Sea off the coast of Norfolk. She was on a voyage from Hartlepool, County Durham to Buenos Aires, Argentina. Thomas Turnbull was refloated with the assistance of three tugs and taken in tow for Lowestoft, Suffolk. She was consequently abandoned in a severely leaky condition. Her crew were rescued by the tug Express (United Kingdom). Thomas Turnbull came ashore at Walcott, Norfolk. |

== 19 January ==
List of shipwrecks: 19 January 1880
| Ship | State | Description |
|---|---|---|
| Æolus | United Kingdom | The ship ran aground on the Maplin Sand, in the North Sea off the coast of Essex. |
| Blackpool | United Kingdom | The ship departed from Wilmington, North Carolina, United States for Liverpool, Lancashire. No further trace, reported missing. |
| Clara | Denmark | The schooner was holed by ice and put in to Cuxhaven, Germany. She was on a voyage from Hamburg, Germany to Pernambuco, Brazil. |
| D. H. Bills | United Kingdom | The barque departed from Liverpool for Wilmington. No further trace, presumed foundered with the loss of all eighteen crew. |
| Eagle | United Kingdom | The ketch sprang a leak and put in to Lowestoft, Suffolk, where she ran aground. She was on a voyage from Goole, Yorkshire to Colchester, Essex. |
| Flying Fish | United Kingdom | The schooner was driven ashore at Octeville-sur-Mer, Seine-Inférieure, France. She was refloated with the assistance of a tug and taken in to Havre de Grâce, Seine-Inférieure. |

== 20 January ==
List of shipwrecks: 20 January 1880
| Ship | State | Description |
|---|---|---|
| Adolf | (Russian Empire) Grand Duchy of Finland | The brig ran aground on the Holme Sand, in the North Sea off the coast of Suffolk, United Kingdom. She was on a voyage from Holmstad, Norway to Great Yarmouth, Norfolk, United Kingdom. |
| Aronca | United Kingdom | The barque was wrecked on the Morant Cays. Her crew were rescued. She was on a voyage from the Cape Verde Islands to Pensacola, Florida, United States. |
| Jane Morgans | United Kingdom | The schooner was driven ashore at New Brighton, Cheshire. She was on a voyage from Liverpool, Lancashire to Buncrana, County Donegal. She was refloated and resumed her voyage. |
| John Byng | United Kingdom | The steamship ran aground at Swansea, Glamorgan. She was on a voyage from Swansea to Malta. |
| Louise Crawshay | United Kingdom | The paddle steamer collided with the paddle tug Progress (United Kingdom) at South Shields, County Durham. Her passengers were taken off by Progress. |
| Richard Warbrick | United Kingdom | The schooner was driven ashore at Walcott, Norfolk. Her crew were rescued. She was on a voyage from Liverpool, Lancashire to Newcastle upon Tyne, Northumberland. |
| William Owen | United Kingdom | The schooner ran aground on the Shipwash Sand, in the North Sea off the coast of Suffolk. She was on a voyage from Aarhus, Denmark to London. She was refloated with the assistance of two smacks and taken in to Harwich, Essex. |
| Bacton Lifeboat | Royal National Lifeboat Institution | The lifeboat capsized at Bacton, Norfolk with the loss of two of her thirteen crew. |
| Unnamed | France | The ship was driven ashore and wrecked near St. Margaret's Bay, Kent, United Kingdom. |

== 21 January ==
List of shipwrecks: 21 January 1880
| Ship | State | Description |
|---|---|---|
| Black Diamond | (United Kingdom of Great Britain and Ireland) Guernsey | The brigantine ran aground on the Goodwin Sands, Kent and was wrecked. She was on a voyage from South Shields, County Durham to Guernsey. |
| Calvilla | United Kingdom | The steamship was driven ashore at Donna Nook, Lincolnshire. She was on a voyage from Alexandria, Egypt to Hull, Yorkshire. She was refloated the next day and towed in to Hull. |
| Clara Louisa | United Kingdom | The brigantine was abandoned in the Bay of Biscay. Her seven crew were rescued by the steamship Britannia (United Kingdom). Clara Louisa was on a voyage from Falmouth, Cornwall to Seville, Spain. |
| Ephratah | United Kingdom | The brig was driven ashore at Lydd, Kent. She was on a voyage from Alloa, Clackmannanshire to Demerara, British Guiana. She was refloated the next day and resumed her voyage. |
| Karoon | Canada | The barque ran aground on the Goodwin Sands. She was refloated and taken in to The Downs. |
| Lady Kinnaird | United Kingdom | The barque was wrecked south of Cape Burr, South Australia. Her crew survived. She was on a voyage from Port Pirie, South Australia to a British port. |
| Pongolia | United Kingdom | The steamship ran aground on the Goodwin Sands. She was on a voyage from the Natal Colony to London. She was refloated the next day and resumed her voyage. |
| Tilkhurst | United Kingdom | The full-rigged ship was driven ashore in the River Thames. She was on a voyage from London to Liverpool, Lancashire. |

== 22 January ==
List of shipwrecks: 22 January 1880
| Ship | State | Description |
|---|---|---|
| Actif, and Sliedrecht | Belgium; Netherlands | The tugs collided at Antwerp. Actif sank with the loss of twelve lives. Sliedrecht was severely damaged. She was beached at Doel, East Flanders. |
| Bertha | United Kingdom | The Thames barge became stuck under Old Battersea Bridge and was scuttled to prevent the collapse of the bridge. |
| Clan Stewart | United Kingdom | The steamship ran aground on the Fort Frederik Bank, in the Scheldt. She was on a voyage from New Orleans, Louisiana, United States to Antwerp, Belgium. She was refloated with the assistance of seven tugs. |
| County of Denbigh | United Kingdom | The barque was sighted in the Atlantic Ocean whilst on a voyage from Astoria, Oregon, United States to Queenstown, County Cork. No further trace, presumed foundered with the loss of all 30 crew. |
| Glenavon | United Kingdom | The steamship ran aground at Faro, Portugal. She was on a voyage from Newcastle upon Tyne, Northumberland to Gibraltar. She was refloated the next day. |
| Glendover | United Kingdom | The schooner ran aground on the Kimmeridge Ledge, in the English Channel off the coast of Dorset. She was on a voyage from A Coruña, Spain to Portsmouth, Hampshire. She was refloated the next day with the assistance of a tug and resumed her voyage. |
| Nebo | United Kingdom | The steamship was driven ashore in the Clyde. She was refloated and taken in to Glasgow, Renfrewshire. |
| Relampago | Portugal | The brigantine was wrecked at Povoação, Azores. |
| Unnamed | United Kingdom | The coble was driven ashore at Redcar, Yorkshire. Both crew were rescued by the Redcar Lifeboat Burton-on-Trent ( Royal National Lifeboat Institution). |
| Unnamed | United Kingdom | The coble was driven ashore at Huntcliff Foot, Yorkshire. Her three crew were rescued by the lifeboat Emma - United Free Gardeners (United Kingdom). |

== 23 January ==
List of shipwrecks: 23 January 1880
| Ship | State | Description |
|---|---|---|
| Bengore | United Kingdom | The steamship foundered off Cape Finisterre, Spain with the loss of thirteen of her nineteen crew. |
| Hans Gyde | Norway | The full-rigged ship ran aground in the Bec d'Ambes. She was on a voyage from Baltimore, Maryland, United States to Bordeaux, Gironde, France. |
| Konigsberg | United Kingdom | The ship ran aground on the Longsand. She was on a voyage from Newcastle upon Tyne, Northumberland to Castellamare del Golfo, Sicily, Italy. |
| Progress | New Zealand | The brigantine was severely holed when she ran aground in Palliser Bay during thick fog. She became a total wreck. |
| Sarah Frazer | United States | The barque collided with the steamship Sardinian (United Kingdom) and sank with the loss of two lives. Sarah Frazer was on a voyage from Portland, Maine to Matanzas, Cuba. |

== 24 January ==
List of shipwrecks: 24 January 1880
| Ship | State | Description |
|---|---|---|
| Agenoria | France | The schooner was driven ashore in a cyclone at Noumea, Society Islands. |
| Bangore | United Kingdom | The steamship was lost 100 nautical miles (190 km) off the coast of Finistère, France. with the loss of thirteen of her nineteen crew. Survivors were rescued by the brig Ancient Promise (United Kingdom). Bangore was on a voyage from Penarth, Glamorgan to Gibraltar. |
| Croix du Sud | France | The ship was driven ashore in a cyclone at Pointe de l'Artillerie, Noumea. |
| Depeche | France | The ship was driven ashore in a cyclone in Vitoe Bay, New Caledonia. |
| Dumbea | France | The schooner sank in a cyclone at Noumea with the loss of three lives. |
| Esperance | France | The schooner was driven ashore in a cyclone at Noumea. |
| Etoile du Matin | France | The schooner was driven ashore in a cyclone at Noumea. |
| Euphrates | United Kingdom | The steamship was driven ashore in Chesapeake Bay. She was on a voyage from Elba, Italy to Baltimore, Maryland, United States. She was refloated with assistance and completed her voyage. |
| Gladiateur | France | The schooner sank in a cyclone at Noumea with the loss of six lives. |
| Gladiator | United Kingdom | The steamship ran aground at Pomaron, Portugal. She was on a voyage from Pomaron to Bristol, Gloucestershire. She was refloated and resumed her voyage. |
| Glendover | United Kingdom | The schooner ran aground on the Kimmeridge Ledge, in the English Channel off the coast of Dorset. She was on a voyage from A Coruña, Spain to Portsmouth, Hampshire. She was refloated and taken in to the Solent. |
| Hovding | United Kingdom | The ship was driven ashore at Atherfield, Isle of Wight. She was on a voyage from Falmouth, Cornwall to London. She was refloated with the assistance of a tug and resumed her voyage. |
| Intimes | France | The ship put into Saint Helena having struck a rock. |
| Noumea | France | The schooner was driven ashore in a cyclone at Noumea. |
| Planete | France | The schooner was driven ashore in a cyclone at Noumea. |
| Reine des Isles | France | The ship was driven ashore in a cyclone in the Loyalty Islands. |
| St. Vincent | France | The ship was driven ashore in a cyclone in the Loyalty Islands. |
| Thor | Norway | The barque was damaged by fire at Havre de Grâce, Seine-Inférieure, France. |
| Two unnamed vessels | France | The ships were driven ashore or sank in a cyclone at Nouméa, Society Islands with the loss of nine lives. |
| Three unnamed vessels | France | The steam launches sank in a cyclone at Noumea. |

== 25 January ==
List of shipwrecks: 25 January 1880
| Ship | State | Description |
|---|---|---|
| Charmer | United States | The steamship was destroyed by fire in the Red River, Louisiana with the loss of eight of her crew. |
| Elouse Caroline | Courland Governorate | The schooner was driven ashore and wrecked between Johnshaven and Gourdon, Aberdeenshire, United Kingdom. She was on a voyage from Christiania, Norway to Leith, Lothian, United Kingdom. |
| Telguera | Spain | The steamship collided with the steamship Ardentienne (Flag unknown) and sank. Her crew were rescued by Ardentienne. |
| Zingari | United Kingdom | The barque was driven ashore at Nethertown, Cumberland. Her crew were rescued. She was on a voyage from Pomaron, Portugal to Silloth, Cumberland. |

== 26 January ==
List of shipwrecks: 26 January 1880
| Ship | State | Description |
|---|---|---|
| Auggantyr | Sweden | The barque ran aground on the Plough Seat, off the coast of Northumberland, United Kingdom. She was on a voyage from New York, United States to Leith, Lothian, United Kingdom. She was refloated and taken in to Lindisfarne, Northumberland. |
| Loundon Castle | United Kingdom | The ship ran aground on the Mouse Sand. She was on a voyage from New York, United States to London. She was refloated. |
| Mary | United Kingdom | The schooner was driven ashore at Nagasaki, Japan. She was on a voyage from Shanghai, China to Nagasaki. She had been refloated by 7 February but was consequently condemned. |
| Padilla | United States of Colombia | The tug ran aground and was wrecked at Colón. |
| Thetis | Germany | The brig was driven ashore at Colón. She was on a voyage from Baranquilla, United States of Colombia to Bremen. She was refloated but had to be beached. |

== 27 January ==
List of shipwrecks: 27 January 1880
| Ship | State | Description |
|---|---|---|
| Albert | United Kingdom | The schooner ran aground at Cádiz, Spain. She was on a voyage from Swansea, Glamorgan to Cádiz. She was refloated and taken in to Cádiz in a leaky condition. |
| Angelo | Malta | The barque ran aground in the River Severn at Shepperdine, Gloucestershire, United Kingdom and broke her back. She was on a voyage from New York, United. |
| Condier, or Courier | Germany | The schooner struck a sunken wreck and foundered in the English Channel 20 nautical miles (37 km) off the Isle of Wight, United Kingdom. Her crew were rescued by the steamship Edmonton (United Kingdom). The schooner was on a voyage from Newcastle upon Tyne, Northumberland, United Kingdom to Licata, Sicily, Italy. |
| Ethel Anne | Germany | The ship ran aground on the Devil's Bank, in Liverpool Bay. She was on a voyage from Hamburg to Liverpool, Lancashire, United Kingdom. She was refloated on 29 January and taken in to Liverpool. |
| Lyra | United Kingdom | The ship ran aground on Halliman's Skerries, off the coast of Moray. She was on a voyage from Runcorn, Cheshire to Lossiemouth, Moray. She was refloated and taken in to Lossiemouth. |
| Margaret Craig | United Kingdom | The ship was driven ashore and wrecked at Lebu, Chile. She was on a voyage from the River Plate to a port on the west coast of South America. |
| Unnamed | United Kingdom | The wherry was run down and sunk at Portsmouth, Hampshire by the steamship Princess Alice (United Kingdom) with the loss on three of the 28 people on board. |

== 28 January ==
List of shipwrecks: 28 January 1880
| Ship | State | Description |
|---|---|---|
| Colonial Empire | United Kingdom | The ship was abandoned in the Atlantic Ocean off Tory Island, County Donegal. Her crew were rescued by Collars (United Kingdom). Colonial Empire was on a voyage from Liverpool, Lancashire to Pensacola, Florida, United States. |
| Lady Ann | United Kingdom | The steamship ran ashore and was wrecked at Flamborough Head, Yorkshire. Her crew were rescued. She was on a voyage from Sunderland, County Durham to Bordeaux, Gironde. |
| Palm | United Kingdom | The steamship ran aground in the Suez Canal. She was on a voyage from Cardiff, Glamorgan to Kurrachee, India. She was refloated on 30 January and resumed her voyage. |
| Sarah Amy | United Kingdom | The schooner was driven ashore at Redcar, Yorkshire. She was on a voyage from Seaham, County Durham to Southampton, Hampshire. She was refloated and resumed her voyage. |
| Viscata | United Kingdom | The schooner sank off Bardsey Island, Pembrokeshire. Her crew were rescued. She was on a voyage from Bantry, County Cork to Liverpool. |
| Woodland Lass | United Kingdom | The ship struck rocks at Redcar. She was on a voyage from London to Middlesbrough, Yorkshire. She was refloated and taken in to Hartlepool, County Durham. |
| James Barrass | United Kingdom | The steamship was driven ashore at Brixton, Isle of Wight, United Kingdom. She was refloated with assistance from the Coastguard and resumed her voyage. |

== 29 January ==
List of shipwrecks: 29 January 1880
| Ship | State | Description |
|---|---|---|
| Bengal | United Kingdom | The ship ran aground in the Suez Canal. She was refloated on 31 January. |
| Constance | United Kingdom | The steamship ran aground at Boulogne, Pas-de-Calais, France. She was on a voyage from Newcastle upon Tyne, Northumberland to Boulogne. She was refloated with assistance from two tugs. |
| Easdale | United Kingdom | The ship was driven ashore and wrecked at Tighnabruiach, Argyllshire. Her crew were rescued. |
| Marie Joseph | France | The schooner was sunk by ice in the Loire. She was on a voyage from Charlestown, South Carolina, United States to Nantes, Loire-Inférieure. |
| Nordpol | Denmark | The steamship ran aground at Atherfield, Isle of Wight, United Kingdom. She was on a voyage from Alexandria, Egypt to Hull, Yorkshire, United Kingdom. She was refloated. |
| Northern Chief | United Kingdom | The ship ran aground in the Kingroad, in the Bristol Channel off the coast of Somerset. She was on a voyage from New York, United States to Bristol, Gloucestershire. |
| Ocean King | United Kingdom | The steamship was driven ashore at Hawthorn Hythe, 2 nautical miles (3.7 km) south of Seaham, County Durham. She was on a voyage from London to Sunderland, County Durham. |
| Palm | United Kingdom | The ship ran aground in the Suez Canal. She was refloated on 31 January. |
| Venus | United Kingdom | The ship caught fire and was beached at New Brighton, Cheshire. The fire was extinguished with assistance from the ferry Promise (United Kingdom). |
| Zigzag | United Kingdom | The schooner was driven ashore and wrecked 1 nautical mile (1.9 km) east of Porthcawl, Glamorgan. |

== 30 January ==
List of shipwrecks: 30 January 1880
| Ship | State | Description |
|---|---|---|
| Alma | Italy | The barque collided with the brigantine Heloise (France) off Ceuta, Spain. She was on a voyage from Troon, Ayrshire, United Kingdom to Venice. She was beached at Gibraltar the next day. |
| Alvarado | Spain | The steamship struck the mole at Barcelona and sank. |
| Anenome | United Kingdom | The collier, a brig, was run down and sunk in the River Thames at Northfleet, Kent by the steamship Swiftsure (United Kingdom). Her seven crew were rescued by Swiftsure. Anenome was on a voyage from Hartlepool, County Durham to London. |
| Basviolian | Sweden | The brig was driven ashore and wrecked on Skagen, Denmark. Her crew were rescued. She was on a voyage from Swansea, Glamorgan, United Kingdom to Copenhagen, Denmark. |
| Bolivia | United Kingdom | The ship was driven ashore at Limerick. She was on a voyage from Baltimore, Maryland, United States to Limerick. She was refloated on 1 February with the assistance of three tugs and found to be leaky. |
| Elizabeth Latham | United Kingdom | The schooner ran aground at Maryport, Cumberland. She was on a voyage from Liverpool, Lancashire to Workington, Cumberland. She was refloated and towed in to Workington. |
| Hamlet | United Kingdom | The ship departed from New York, United States for Galle, Ceylon. No further trace, reported overdue. |
| Iserbrook | United Kingdom | The burned-out hulk of the brig – destroyed by fire and scuttled on 21 December 1878 and refloated in 1879 – sank again in Sydney Harbour, New South Wales, Australia. |
| Joseph | United Kingdom | The schooner was driven ashore and severely damaged at Nash Point, Glamorgan. She was on a voyage from Redon, Ille-et-Vilaine, France to Cardiff, Glamorgan. |

== 31 January ==
List of shipwrecks: 31 January 1879
| Ship | State | Description |
|---|---|---|
| Crown Jewel | United Kingdom | The barque was damaged by fire at New Orleans, Louisiana, United States. |
| Maitland | United Kingdom | The steamship collided with St. Andries (United Kingdom) and sank off Ouessant, Finistère, France. Her crew were rescued by St. Andries. Maitland was on a voyage from Cardiff, Glamorgan to Les Sables-d'Olonne, Vendée, France. |

== Unknown date ==
List of shipwrecks: Unknown date in January 1879
| Ship | State | Description |
|---|---|---|
| Afton | United Kingdom | The barque was driven ashore at Point Godavari, India. |
| Aghios Minos | Greece | The brig was sunk by ice off "Chefort". |
| Albert | France | The schooner struck a submerged object at Cádiz, Spain and was beached. |
| Alexander Mackenzie | United Kingdom | The ship was wrecked on the Wielingen Sandbank. Her crew were rescued. She was on a voyage from New York, United States to Antwerp, Belgium. |
| Arab | United Kingdom | The brig collided with the steamship Farnley (United Kingdom) off Havre de Grâce, Seine-Inférieure, France and was abandoned by her crew. |
| Atlas | United Kingdom | The steamship ran aground on the Rockelais Reef. She was on a voyage from Gonaïves, Haiti to New York. She was refloated and completed her voyage. |
| Brisbane | Queensland | The steamship ran aground on a reef in the Arafura Sea. She was on a voyage from Brisbane to Singapore, Straits Settlements. She was refloated four days later and resumed her voyage. She arrived at Singapore on 24 January and was placed under repair. |
| Charley | United Kingdom | The ship was damaged by fire at New Orleans, Louisiana, United States. |
| Concord | United Kingdom | The lugger struck the Black Rock. She was on a voyage from Newport, Monmouthshire to Saint-Valery-sur-Somme, Somme, France. She was towed in to Falmouth, Cornwall and beached. |
| Craigie Lea | United Kingdom | The ship was wrecked at Bull Point, Falkland Islands before 12 January. She was reported to be on a voyage from Sydney, New South Wales to Malden Island. |
| Cypriot | United Kingdom | The ship was abandoned in the Atlantic Ocean before 22 January. Her crew were rescued. She was towed in to Akassa, Lagos Colony, where she was condemned. |
| Edinburgh | United Kingdom | The steamship ran aground. She was refloated and taken in to Pampang, Netherlands East Indies for repairs. |
| Emerald Isle | United States | The ship was driven ashore in the Gaspar Strait. She was refloated and taken in to Batavia, Netherlands East Indies in a leaky condition. |
| Ennerdale | United Kingdom | The steamship ran aground at Fawson's Point, Ottoman Empire. She was on a voyage from Odesa, Russia to Gibraltar. She was refloated on 10 January and resumed her voyage the next day. |
| Felguera | Spain | The steamship collided with the steamship Ardantinny (United Kingdom) and sank at Valencia, Spain. Her crew were rescued. |
| Fiery Cross | United Kingdom | The steam trawler ran aground on the Black Middens, in the North Sea off the coast of County Durham and was severely damaged. She was refloated and taken in to South Shields, County Durham in a severely leaky condition. |
| Galatea | United Kingdom | The ketch ran aground on the Gunfleet Sand, in the North Sea off the coast of Essex. She was on a voyage from London to Hull, Yorkshire. She was refloated on 23 January with the assistance of six smacks and assisted in to Harwich, Essex. |
| Gerard C. Tobey | United States | The ship collided with the steamship City of Savannah (United States) and sank at New York. Gerard C. Tobey was on a voyage from New York to London. |
| Hansa | Germany | The steamship was driven ashore on Terschelling, Friesland, Netherlands. Her crew were rescued. She was on a voyage from New York to Bremen. She broke in two on 6 January. |
| Henrietta Bubsa | Brazil | The schooner was driven ashore at "Caixos". |
| Hopeful | United Kingdom | The brigantine was driven ashore at Cardwell, Queensland on or before 21 January. She was abandoned as a total loss. |
| Leopoldine | Germany | The ship capsized with the loss of all hands. |
| Louisiana | United States | The steamship ran aground off "Errol Island". She was on a voyage from New York to New Orleans. She was refloated and completed her voyage, arriving at New Orleans on 29 January. |
| Maggie Burke | United Kingdom | The steamship was destroyed by fire at Mobile, Alabama, United States. |
| Maria | Sweden | The barque was driven ashore on Martinique. She was refloated and towed in to Fort-de-France for repairs. |
| Meridian | United Kingdom | The ship was abandoned at sea. Her crew were rescued. She was on a voyage from Boston, Massachusetts, United States to Ipswich, Suffolk. |
| Mary and Agnes | United Kingdom | The smack foundered off the Horse Isle, in the Firth of Clyde. Her crew were rescued. She was on a voyage from Ardrossan, Ayrshire to Rothesay, Isle of Bute. |
| Minna | Germany | The ship foundered in the Baltic Sea off Marstrand, Sweden. She was on a voyage from Charlestown, Cornwall, United Kingdom to Gothenburg, Sweden. |
| Mount Stewart | United Kingdom | The schooner was driven ashore and wrecked at Ardtole, County Down. Her crew survived. |
| North Carolina | United States | The ship was driven ashore and wrecked on the Wester Reef, off Bermuda before 10 January. She was on a voyage from Baltimore to Liverpool, Lancashire, United Kingdom. She was refloated but consequently sank. |
| Olive Branch | United Kingdom | The smack was driven ashore at "Ballyguntin", County Down. She was a total loss. |
| Olivet | United Kingdom | The barque foundered in the Bay of Biscay after 13 January. Her thirteen crew were rescued by Bell Starr (Canada) Canada). Olivet was on a voyage from Sunderland, County Durham to Batavia. |
| Ophelia | United Kingdom | The ship was driven ashore and wrecked at Stavanger, Norway. Her crew were rescued. She was on a voyage from Hull to the Lofoten Islands, Norway. |
| Paralos | France | The barque struck the Bellows Rock and sank off the coast of the Cape Colony. Her crew were rescued. She was on a voyage from Amboyna Bay to London. |
| Paris | United Kingdom | The steamship was driven ashore at Cap Gris Nez, Pas-de-Calais, France. She was on a voyage from Dover, Kent to Calais. |
| Parmenio | Flag unknown | The ship was driven ashore on the east coast of Formosa. She was on a voyage from Penang, Straits Settlements to "Saiwantoo". |
| Penguin | United Kingdom | The steamship was wrecked on Zuqar Island. |
| Railway | United Kingdom | The schooner grounded at her berth at Berwick upon Tweed and sprang a severe leak. |
| Ranavola | United Kingdom | The barque was driven ashore on the "Isle of Muck", County Antrim. Her crew were rescued. She was on a voyage from Liverpool to Newcastle upon Tyne, Northumberland. She was refloated on 2 February and towed in to Belfast, County Antrim. |
| Resolution | United Kingdom | The brig was wrecked at Salinas, Brazil. Her crew were rescued by the barque Adelaide (Portugal). Resolution was on a voyage from Newcastle upon Tyne to Salinas. |
| Rio | Denmark | The brig was driven ashore and wrecked at Quequén, Argentina. Her crew were rescued. |
| Robert Draper | United Kingdom | The schooner foundered in the North Sea on or before 3 January. Her crew survived. She was on a voyage from Liverpool to Aberdeen. |
| Royal Oak | United Kingdom | The ship was driven ashore at Bremen, Germany. She was on a voyage from Callao, Peru to Hamburg, Germany. She was refloated with the assistance of two steamships and towed in to Geestemünde in a leaky condition. |
| Sam Slick | United Kingdom | The schooner was driven ashore and wrecked on the Isle of Whithorn, Wigtownshire. She was on a voyage from the Isle of Whithorn to Belfast, County Antrim. |
| Thomas and Alice | United Kingdom | The ship was driven ashore on Gigha, Inner Hebrides. She was refloated. |
| Thor | United Kingdom | The barque ran aground at New York. She was refloated. |
| Tollington | Canada | The ship was driven ashore on Ameland, Friesland. Her crew were rescued. She was on a voyage from Bremerhaven, Germany to an American port. |
| Vasco de Gama | Portugal | The ship was driven ashore at New York. She was on a voyage from Ipswich, Suffolk to New York. She was refloated. |
| Vetus | United Kingdom | The ship caught fire whilst on a voyage from Runcorn, Cheshire to Cette, Hérault, France. She put back to the River Mersey, where she arrived on 29 January. |
| William and Elizabeth | United Kingdom | The smack ran aground on the Newcombe Sand, in the North Sea off the coast of Suffolk. She was refloated with assistance from the tug Dispatch. |
| W. J. Taylor | United Kingdom | The steamship sank at the mouth of the River Tyne. She was refloated and an attempt was made to take her in to South Shields, County Durham but she sank again. |
| Zeno | United Kingdom | The brig was driven ashore at Spittal Point, Northumberland and was damaged. She was refloated and taken in to Berwick upon Tweed. |
| Zigzag | United Kingdom | The schooner was driven ashore and sank 1 nautical mile (1.9 km) east of Porthcawl, Glamorgan. |
| Unnamed | Flag unknown | The schooner ran aground on the Shipwash Sand, in the North Sea off the coast of Suffolk. |
| Unnamed | Flag unknown | The ship was driven ashore on Ameland, Friesland. |
