= Bur (disambiguation) =

A bur or burr is a type of seed or fruit with short, stiff bristles or hooks.

Bur, Burs, BUR, etc. may also refer to:

== Places ==
- Baverd, also known as Būr, a village in Hormozgan Province, Iran
- Bur, Denmark, a railway town in West Jutland, Denmark
- Bur, Iran, a village in Hamadan Province
- Bur, Yemen, a village in the Hadhramaut Governorate
- Bur (river), Yakutia, Russia
- Burkina Faso, "BUR" is the International Olympic Committee country code for the country in Africa
- Burma, obsolete UNDP country code since 1989, now Myanmar

== Transportation ==
- Hollywood Burbank Airport, in Burbank, California, with IATA airport code BUR

== Other ==
- MGK Bur, a Russian grenade launcher
- Burmese language (ISO 639-2 code)
- Burs (Dacia), a Germanic tribe
- BUR, an abbreviation of a type of roof covering system on flat roofs called a built up roof
- BUR, an abbreviation of Biblioteca Universale Rizzoli, an imprint of Rizzoli Libri
- Bur or Burr (cutter), a small cutter used in rotary tools for metalworking
- Burl in US English, the equivalent of burr or bur in UK English, an irregular growth in trees

== See also ==
- Burr (disambiguation)
