= Burr =

Burr may refer to:

== Places ==
=== Australia ===
- Cape Burr, a headland in South Australia
- Mount Burr, South Australia, a town and mountain

=== United States ===
- Burr, Minnesota, an unincorporated community
- Burr, Missouri, an unincorporated community
- Burr, Nebraska, a village
- Burr, Texas, an unincorporated community
- Burr, West Virginia, an unincorporated community

=== Elsewhere ===
- Burr, Saskatchewan, a hamlet in Canada
- Burr Point, the easternmost point of mainland Ireland
- Burr (crater), on the Jovian moon Callisto

== People ==
- Burr (surname)
- Burr (given name)

== Arts and entertainment ==
- Burr (novel), a book about Aaron Burr by Gore Vidal
- Burr Redding, a fictional character in the television series Oz
- "Burr", a song by the Smashing Pumpkins from Atum: A Rock Opera in Three Acts, 2023

== Other uses ==
- Burr (edge), a deformation of metal wherein a raised edge forms on a metal part which has been machined
- Burr (cutter), a small cutter used in rotary tools for metalworking
- Burr mill, used to grind hard, small food products
- Bur or burr, a spiky seed pod
- Burl, burr in British English, an irregular growth in trees
- Burr or Borr, a god of Norse mythology
- × Burrageara, an orchid genus for which the abbreviation is Burr.
- Butch cut or burr, a haircut
- Burr Gymnasium, a multi-purpose arena in Washington, D.C., home of the Howard University basketball team

== See also ==
- Berr (disambiguation)
- Birr (disambiguation)
- Bur (disambiguation)
- Burr distribution, a statistical continuous probability distribution
- Burr puzzle, a type of interlocking mechanical puzzle
- Burr Truss, an architectural feature often used in covered bridges
- Northumbrian Burr, a distinctive pronunciation of the letter R found in the northeast of England
