= Aaron Burr (disambiguation) =

Aaron Burr (1756–1836) was an American politician and the 3rd vice president of the United States.

Aaron Burr may also refer to:

- Aaron Burr Sr. (1716–1757), American minister and educator, and the father of Aaron Burr
- Aaron Columbus Burr (1808–1882), son of Aaron Burr
- Aaron Burr (advertisement), 1993 advertisement for the Got Milk? advertising campaign

== See also ==
- Aaron (given name)
- Burr (surname)
- "Aaron Burr, Sir", a song from the 2015 musical Hamilton
