= Nautical Archaeology Association of South Australia =

Former maritime archaeology association

Nautical Archaeological Association of South Australia
- Abbreviation: NAASA
- Formation: 1 May 1982; 44 years ago
- Dissolved: early 1990s
- Type: NGO
- Legal status: Incorporated Association
- Purpose: Amateur Maritime Archaeology
- Region served: South Australia

The Nautical Archaeological Association of South Australia (NAASA) was an amateur maritime archaeology organisation which was founded in 1982 by individuals who resigned from the Society for Underwater Historical Research (SUHR) in April 1982 following a dispute. The association is believed to have ceased operation in the early 1990s.

== Naming Controversy ==
The newly formed Association had proposed to be known as the Maritime Archaeology Association of South Australia. However, the SUHR quickly altered its official name to The Society for Underwater Historical Research (Maritime Archaeology Association of South Australia) Incorporated to prevent this action. The reason given by the SUHR for its action was that it ‘has been known interstate as the Maritime Archaeology Association of South Australia for some years.'

== HMS Buffalo wreck site discovery ==
In April 1986, NAASA participated in an expedition led by the South Australian Government's State Heritage Branch to search for and to survey the wreck of HMS Buffalo in Mercury Bay, Whitianga, New Zealand.
