= Margaret Rule =

British archaeologist who led the Mary Rose project

Margaret Rule CBE FRSA
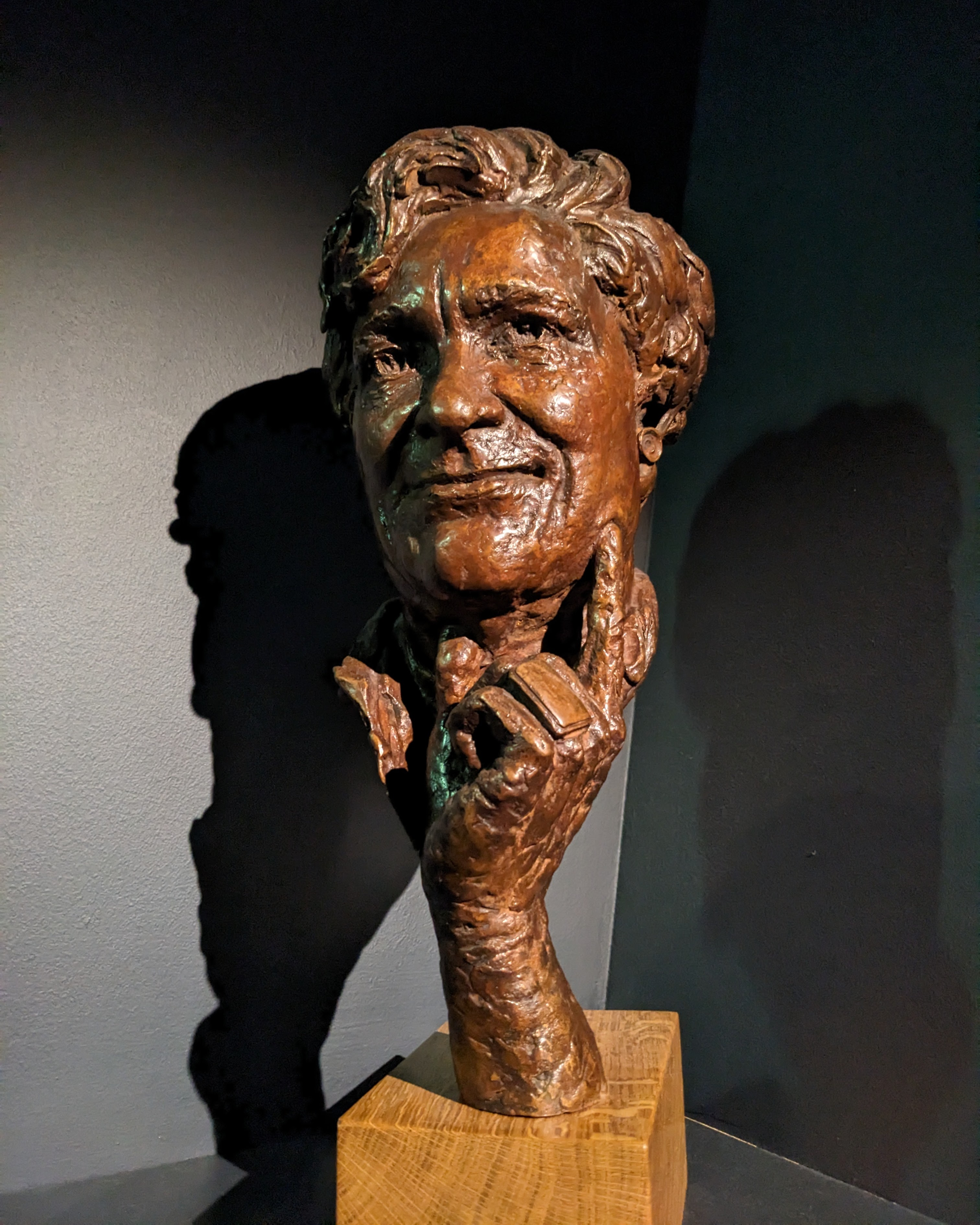
- Sculpture of Rule by Luke Shepherd on display at the Mary Rose Museum
- Born: Margaret Helen Martin; 27 September 1928; Buckinghamshire
- Died: 9 April 2015 (aged 86)
- Education: University of London
- Scientific career
- Fields: maritime archaeology

Margaret Helen Rule (27 September 1928 – 9 April 2015) was a British archaeologist. She is most notable for her involvement with the project that excavated and raised the Tudor warship Mary Rose in 1982.

== Early life ==
Rule, née Martin, was born in Buckinghamshire on 27 September 1928. She studied chemistry at the University of London.

Rule changed to a career in archaeology where she initially helped excavate bomb sites in London after the Second World War.

== Career ==
=== Fishbourne Roman Palace ===
In the 1960s, Rule assisted in the discovery, excavation and ultimately became the first curator of the Fishbourne Roman Palace near Chichester, West Sussex. Rule subsequently was integral for transforming the site into a viable tourist attraction.

=== Mary Rose ===
Rule was still the curator of the Fishbourne Roman Palace, when she began her work in maritime archaeology.

Rule assisted fellow marine archaeologist Alexander McKee in the 1960s where she was consulted on the initial search for the wreck of Henry VIII's war ship Mary Rose in the Solent, due to her local reputation as a land archaeologist. Here the Mary Rose 1967 Committee was founded, later to be formalised as the Mary Rose Trust in 1979.

During this time Rule learnt to dive with the Southampton branch of the British Sub-Aqua Club in order to supervise and work on the wreck for herself.

Rule played a pivotal role in both the publicity and campaign for vital backing in order to raise the Mary Rose.

A notable addition to the diver team under Rule's leadership was the then Charles, Prince of Wales.

The Mary Rose was raised on 11 October 1982 with Rule present on the floating crane Tog Mor. This was viewed on live TV worldwide by an estimated 60 million viewers.

=== Other noted contributions ===
Rule continuously contributed to maritime archaeology by assisting in the passing of the Protection of Wrecks Act in 1973. In 1974 Rule became a member of the Advisory Committee formed to review all applications to the Department of Trade for designating a 'protected wreck site'.

In March 1982, Rule visited Adelaide, South Australia, as the keynote speaker to the Second Southern Hemisphere Conference on Maritime Archaeology. During the conference she visited the historic Murray River port of Morgan and dived with members of the Society for Underwater Historical Research (SUHR) on a project to record and recover items from the riverbed alongside the town's massive wharf.

Since 2012 Rule worked closely with the Maritime Heritage Foundation, as chairman of its Scientific Advisory Committee.

== Later life ==
Rule had been living with Parkinson's disease and arthritis in her later years. She died on 9 April 2015, aged 86.

== Obituaries ==
- British Sub Aqua Club – 'Tributes paid to Dr Margaret Rule, lead archaeologist of the Mary Rose' Monday 13 April 2015
- Isabel Berwick, Financial Times – 'Margaret Rule, archaeologist, 1928–2015' Friday 17 April 2015
- Peter Marsden, The Guardian – 'Archaeologist responsible for raising the wreck of the Mary Rose, Henry VIII's flagship, from the seabed' Thursday 16 April 2015
- Matthew Bannister, Last Word, BBC Radio 4 – 'Margaret Rule was the archaeologist who supervised the raising of Henry VIII's flagship, the Mary Rose from the seabed under the waters of the Solent' Friday 24 April 2015
- Rosemary E Lunn, X-Ray Magazine – 'Margaret Rule 1928 – 2015' Friday 29 April 2015

== Honours ==
She was made a Commander of the Order of the British Empire. In 1995, the National Maritime Museum awarded her its Caird Medal. In 2001 the University of Portsmouth named a new 342 bed student accommodation block Margaret Rule Hall after her. In 2008, she was awarded the Colin Mcleod Award for "Furthering international co-operation in diving" by the British Sub Aqua Club.

== Sources ==
- Margret Rule at the Archaeological Data Service

== Bibliography ==
- Down, Alec; Rule, Margaret (1971). Chichester Excavations. Chichester, West Sussex: Chichester Civic Society Excavations Committee. ISBN 0950143804.
- Rule, Margaret (1974). Floor Mosaics in Roman Britain. London: Macmillan / Sussex Archaeological Trust. ISBN 0333148282.
- Rule, Margaret (1977). Fishbourne Roman Palace. Sussex: Sussex Archaeological Society.
- Rule, Margaret (1982). The Mary Rose: the Excavation and Raising of Henry VIII's Flagship. Leicester: Windward. ISBN 0711203164.
- Rule, Margaret; Monaghan, Jason (1993). A Gallo-Roman Trading Vessel from Guernsey: The Excavation and Recovery of a Third Century Shipwreck. Guernsey: Guernsey Museums & Galleries. ISBN 1871560039.
- Contributor to: May, Eric; Jones, Mark, eds. (2006). Conservation Science: Heritage Materials. Cambridge, UK: RSC Publishing. ISBN 0854046593.
