= Society for Underwater Historical Research =

Amateur maritime archaeology organisation in South Australia

- Abbreviation: SUHR
- Successor: South Australian Archaeology Society
- Formation: 30 September 1974; 52 years ago
- Dissolved: 12 March 2012
- Type: NGO
- Legal status: Incorporated association
- Purpose: Amateur Maritime Archaeology
- Region served: South Australia
- Key people: Doug Seton; Peter Christopher; Brian Marfleet
- Affiliations: Friends of Parks
- Website: SUHR Publications website

The Society for Underwater Historical Research (SUHR) was an amateur maritime archaeology organisation operating in South Australia (SA). It was formed in 1974 by recreational scuba divers and other persons to pursue an interest in maritime archaeology and maritime history. The SUHR was renamed as the South Australian Archaeology Society in March 2012 as part of a plan to expand its activities beyond maritime archaeology to include other archaeological disciplines.

== Origins ==
The SUHR was founded in September 1974 by recreational scuba divers principally from the Underwater Explorers Club of South Australia (UEC) and occupational scuba divers from government agencies such as the South Australian Museum and the South Australian Police, as well as a number of individuals interested in maritime history.

The origin of the SUHR is due in part to the positive public response to the aftermath of a successful expedition in 1973 to locate and recover two anchors discarded during 1803 by HMS Investigator whilst under the command of Matthew Flinders off the coast of what is now Western Australia. The recovery of the anchors and their connection to the voyage of HMS Investigator is commemorated in the inclusion of the best bower anchor and the outline of the Australian continent on the SUHR emblem.

== Organisation ==
After its formation in 1974, the SUHR was initially managed by a committee consisting of a President, Vice President, Secretary, Treasurer and the following specialist officers – Research Officer, Registrar of Relics (added in 1976), an officer to liaise with the responsible part of the South Australian Government which was initially the South Australian Museum, and an officer to liaise with the South Australian Police Force (removed in 1978). By the late 1970s, it had evolved into a project-based organisation whose work consisted of activities such as planning, research, exploration, logistics, photography, survey and the publication of reports. Activities such as recovery and conservation, while historically significant, ceased to be carried out in the late 1980s except where permitted by archaeological practice. In April 1982, a group within the membership who were unhappy with the increasing level of professionalization, resigned and founded a competing organisation known as the Nautical Archaeology Association of South Australia. In 1999, after nearly a decade of stagnation, new life was breathed in the organisation via new funding opportunities and interest in membership from undergraduate and postgraduate archaeology students.

== Projects ==
=== The 1970s ===
- The SUHR’s first project was a survey ( including excavation of artefacts) of the remains of the Glenelg Jetty at Holdfast Bay which were destroyed by a storm in April 1948.
- Loch Vennachar – discovery of the wreck site on the west coast of Kangaroo Island in 1976, a site survey and the recovery of some material in February 1977 followed by the recovery and conservation of an anchor in 1980.
- Morgan – recovery of artefacts from the River Murray immediately adjoining the wharf during the years 1977 to 1983.
- Star of Greece – a survey of the wreck site at Port Willunga during early 1978.
- Grecian – survey of the shipwreck located near North Haven including the recovery of some material during the years 1978 to 1980.
- Santiago – survey of the abandoned hull near Port Adelaide during 1978.
- Lady Kinnaird – the recovery of a large anchor from the wreck site near Port Neill during 1979 in response to a request from the local community, and its subsequent conservation and installation for public display in Port Neill in 1980.
- Norma – a survey of the wreck site located west of Semaphore during the period April to December 1979.

=== The 1980s ===
- An anchor found in Fishery Bay near Port Lincoln by an abalone diver was recovered by the SUHR and local divers during January 1981. It was then conserved with the intent of placing it on public display at 'Whaler’s Way', a privately owned nature reserve near the site where the anchor was originally found. The anchor is currently on display at the Axel Stenross Maritime Museum in Port Lincoln.
- Tigress – discovery of the shipwreck at Robinson Point south of Port Noarlunga in late 1981 and the subsequent recovery of artefacts from shipwreck site in early 1982.
- Wardang Island – a survey carried out in early 1982 to locate and document the wreck sites of the following ships – SS Australian, MacIntyre, Monarch, Notre Dame D'Arvor, SS Investigator, Aagot, Songvaar, Moorara, and Maid of Australia. The strandings of the ships Candida, and Jean Bart were also studied.
- Zanoni – the unsuccessful search for the wreck site near Ardrossan during 1982 and 1983 up until its discovery by others in April 1983. The SUHR subsequently assisted on archaeology surveys during the three seasons of fieldwork conducted by the South Australian Government in the late 1980s.
- Water Witch – the discovery of the shipwreck in the River Murray near Blanchetown in 1982 followed by a survey project in 1984 in association with the South Australian Government and divers from the South Australian Police.
- Cowrie (also spelt Cowry) – unsuccessful search for the wreck site near Yankalilla during 1987.
- Port Elliot – a survey carried out during 1987 and 1988 to locate and document the wreck sites of the following ships: Emu, Commodore, Josephine L'Oizeau, Lapwing, Harry, Flying Fish and Athol.
- Margaret Brock Reef – a project conducted during 1987 to locate the wreck of the Margaret Brock on the Margaret Brock Reef near Kingston SE.
- The North Arm Ships' Graveyard – a project run during the years 1989 and 1990 to research and survey abandoned hulls in North Arm of the Port River such as the following – Flinders, Gem, Grace Darling, Garthneill, Karatta, Mangana, Sarnia, Dorothy H, Sterling, Stanley, Sunbeam and Ullock.
- "Steamships" was a project to research and survey the following steam-powered vessels during 1989 -1990 – SS Australian, SS Clan Ranald, SS Investigator, and SS Willyama.

The SUHR also participated in archaeological work organised by others concerning the following wreck sites:

- Wreck site of an unknown vessel near Point Cloates, Ningaloo, Western Australia during 1980.
- Xantho, Port Gregory, Western Australia during 1983.
- HMS Pandora, near Cape York Peninsula, Queensland during 1984.

=== The 1990s ===
- Lillie May – an unsuccessful search for the wreck site near Port Hughes during 1992.
- Holdfast Bay – a second project carried out at the remains of the Glenelg Jetty destroyed in 1948 during early 2000 to undertake additional survey and artefact recovery works and to create an exhibit in the former Glenelg Town Hall.

=== The 2000s ===
- Star of Greece – a second project involving a non-disturbance measured survey was carried out from 2002 to 2004.
- SS Ellen – survey of the wreck site located at Morgan’s Beach near Cape Jervis in early 2003.

== Advocacy ==
During the late 1970s and the early 1980s, the SUHR actively lobbied alone and with others for government action on the following matters:

- Extension of the Commonwealth Historic Shipwrecks Act 1976 to the coastal waters of South Australia (i.e. from the Low Water Mark out to three nautical miles) which was realized in 1980.
- The enactment of specific South Australian shipwrecks legislation to complement the Commonwealth Act which was realised in 1981,
- The appointment of a Government maritime archaeologist which was realised in late 1981
- The creation of a maritime museum which was realised by the opening of the South Australian Maritime Museum at Port Adelaide in 1986.

== Publications ==
=== Reports ===
- Sexton, Robert T (1975), South Australian Shipwrecks 1800–1899, Society for Underwater Historical Research, ISBN 0-9597500-0-2, OCLC 27625697
- Sexton, Robert T., (1976), Shape of Ships: The Cross-section OCLC: 221124455.
- Various, (1977), Loch Vennachar Expedition Report, (ISBN 0 9597500 1 0). OCLC: 27625714.
- Hale, Alan, (1980), The Wreck of the Lady Kinnaird, (ISBN 0 9597500 2 9) OCLC: 220361798.
- Various, (1983), Wardang Island: Graveyard of Ships: Technical Report, (ISBN 0 9597500 5 3) OCLC: 220216731.
- Various, (1983), Wardang Island: Graveyard of Ships, (ISBN 0 9597500 3 7) OCLC: 220216792.
- Drew, Terry, (1983), The Holdfast Bay Project 1974–1978, (ISBN 0 9597500 4 5) OCLC: 220188245.
- Kentish, Peter & Booth, Brenton, (1983), Conservation of the Loch Vennachar Anchor, (ISBN 0 9597500 6 1) OCLC: 215801002.
- Kentish, Peter; Drew, Terry & Booth, Brenton (1985), The Anchor – Fishery Bay, Eyre Peninsular, (ISBN 0 9597500 8 8) OCLC: 27625732.
- Harris, Chris A., (1986), The Discovery and Survey of the wreck Tigress, (ISBN 0 9597500 9 6) OCLC: 219985703.
- Perkins, John, (1988), The Shipwrecks of Port Elliot 1853–1864, (ISBN 0 9588006 0 X) OCLC: 26446519.
- Christopher, Peter, South Australian Shipwrecks: A Database (1802–1989); Paperback edition – (1990), (ISBN 0 9588006 1 8) and PDF on CD-ROM (Adobe Version 5) edition (2006), (ISBN 0 9588006 2 6) OCLC: 25914190 and OCLC: 224865467.
- Marfleet, Brian, (2006), The Morgan Project, (ISBN 0 9588006 5 0 – set containing volumes 1 & 2), The Morgan Project: Volume 1 – Progress, Newsletter & Annual Reports (1977–1983) (ISBN 0 9588006 3 4) and The Morgan Project: Volume 2 – The Final Report (1989) (ISBN 0 9588006 4 2) – PDF on CD-ROM (Adobe Version 5) edition OCLC: 224749850.

=== Collections ===
- Cowan, David (editor), (2007), The Society for Underwater Historical Research – Publications 1974–2004, (ISBN 978 0 9588006 6 2). OCLC: 225516296.

=== Serials ===
- Annual Reports for the years 1979 to 1988 ISSN 0157-7646 OCLC: 220111704.
- Soundings – newsletter prepared during the years 1988 to 1992 ISSN 1445-0712 OCLC: 220469036.
- Soundings (2nd Series) – newsletter prepared during the years 2000 to 2004 ISSN 1445-0712 OCLC: 220469036.

== Gallery ==
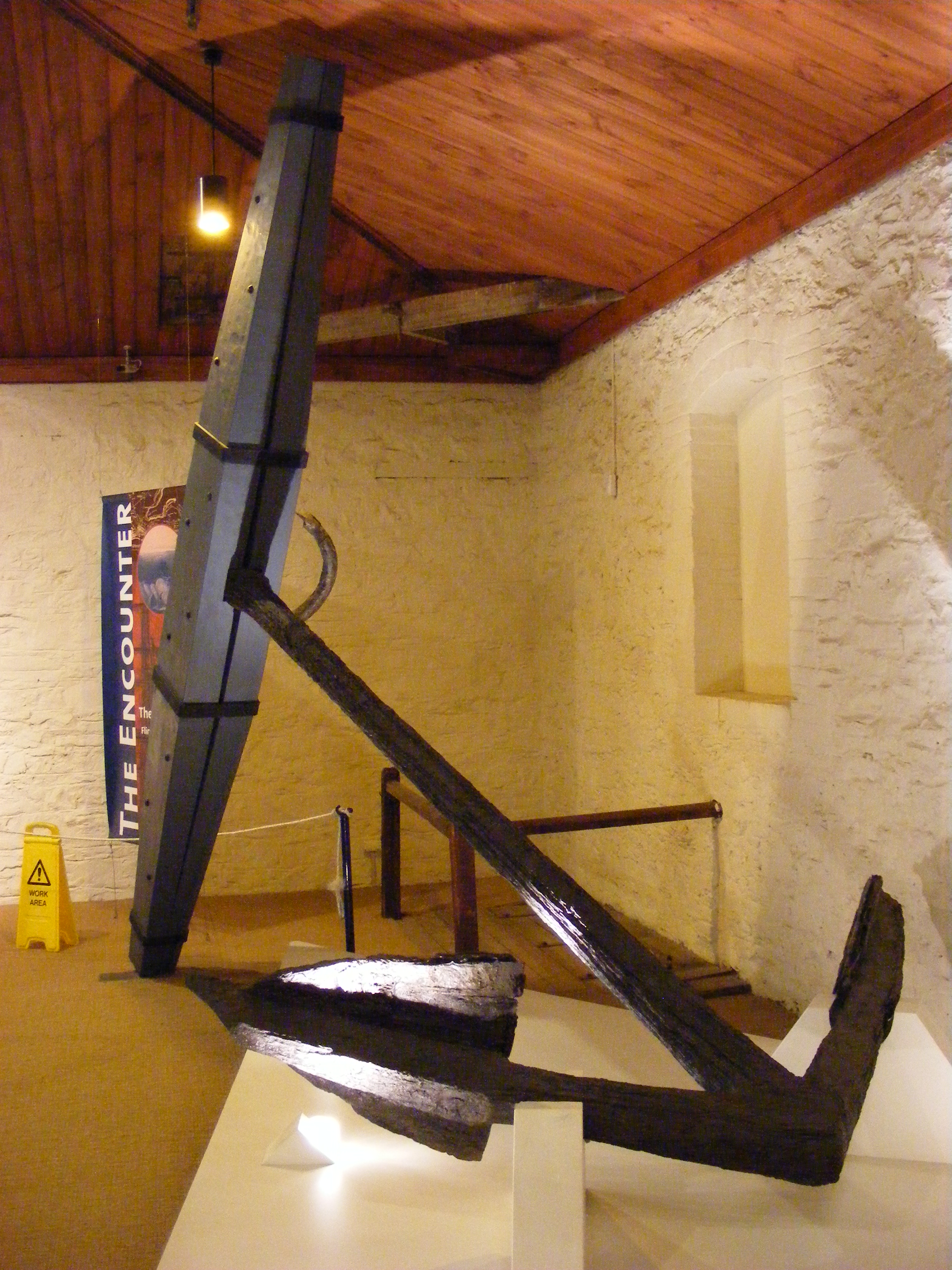
Best Bower Anchor dropped from HMS Investigator by Matthew Flinders in 1803. Recovered by the Underwater Explorers Club of SA in 1973. On display at the South Australian Maritime Museum.

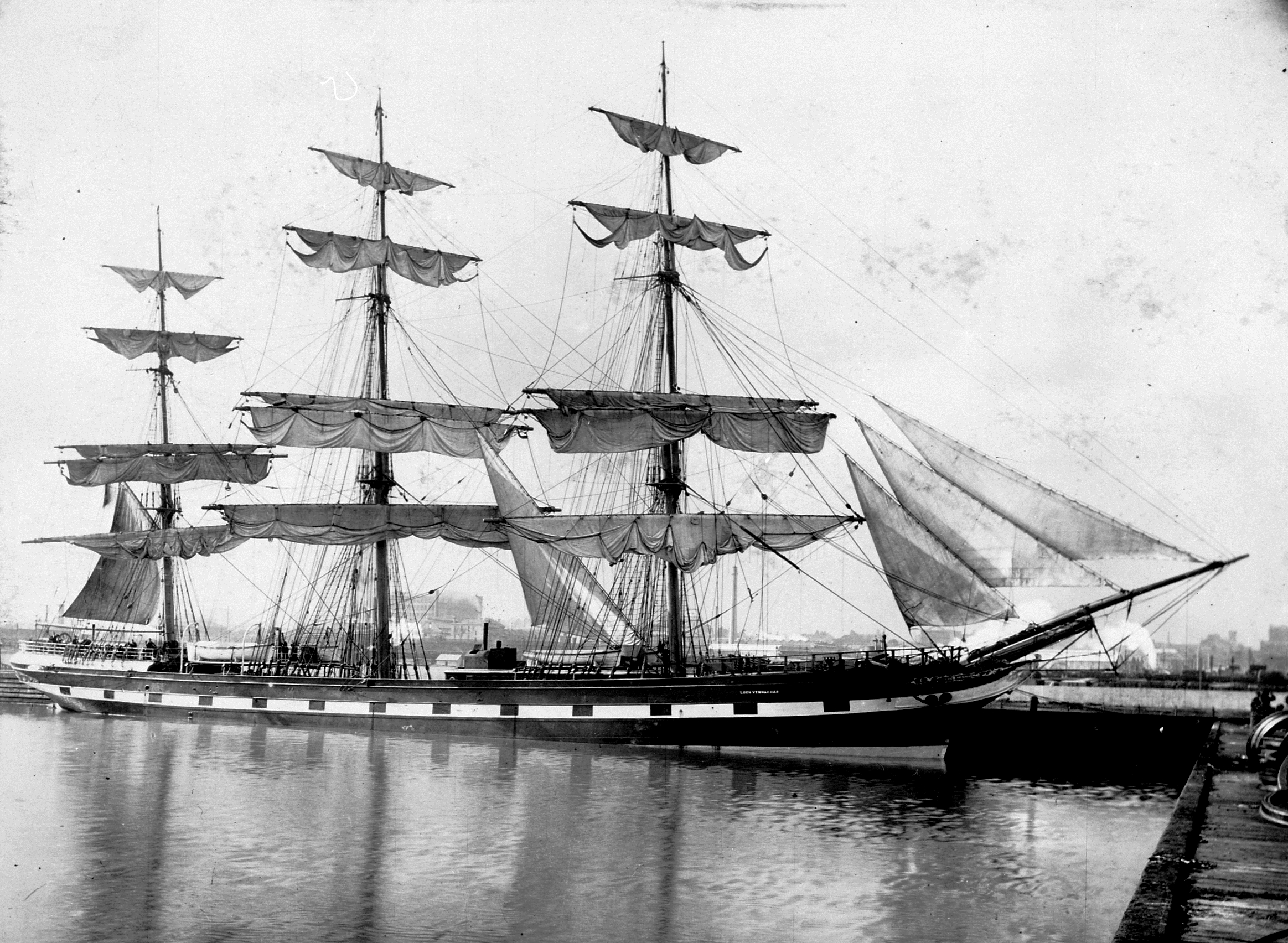
Loch Vennachar. Glasgow. 1485 Tons. Built at Glasgow. 1875. Wrecked, Kangaroo Island 1905. Wreck site discovered by the SUHR in 1976.

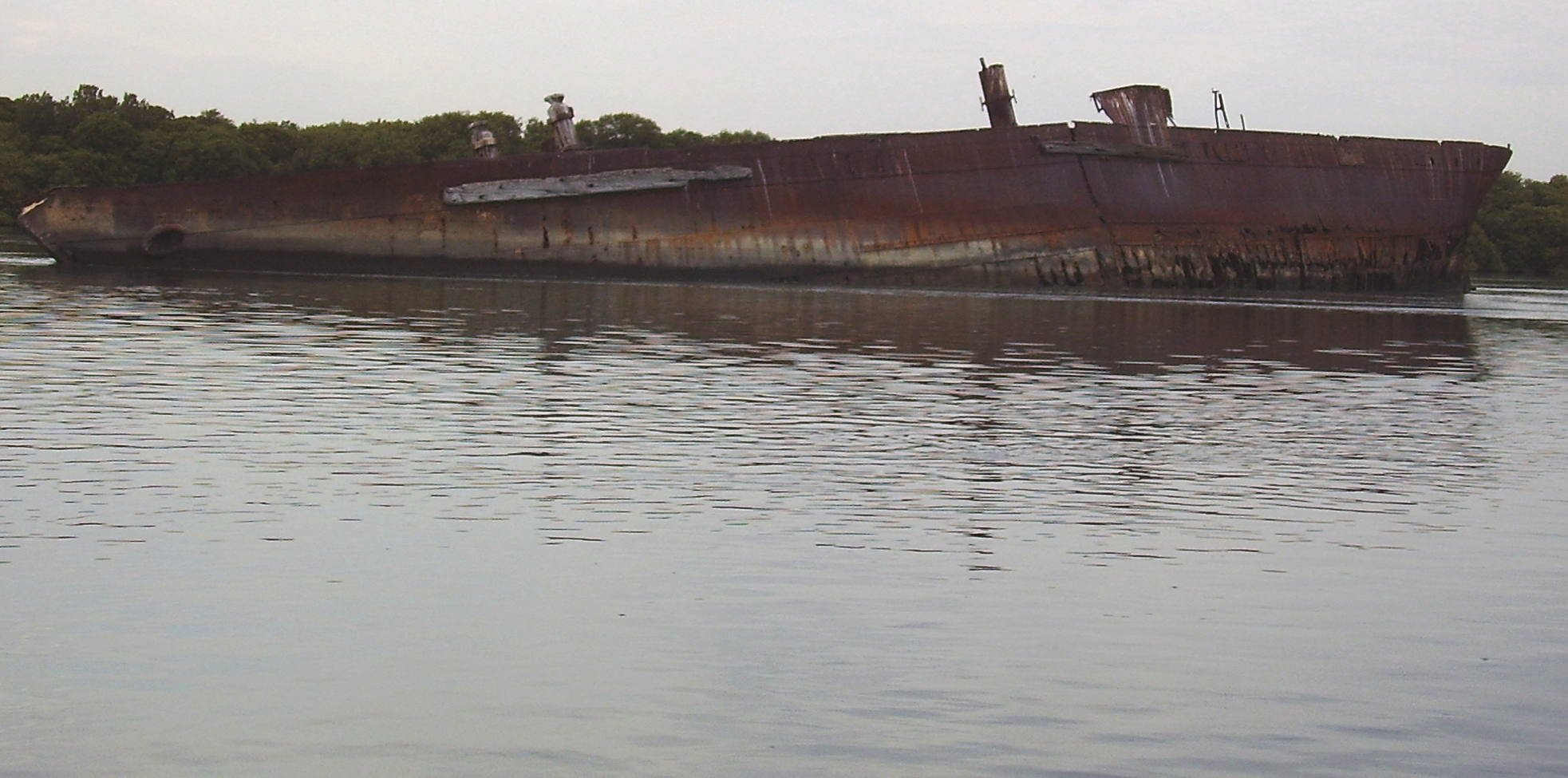
Wreck of Santiago, in the ships graveyard in the North Arm, a waterway between the Port River and Barker Inlet, Port Adelaide, South Australia. Originally surveyed by the SUHR in 1978.

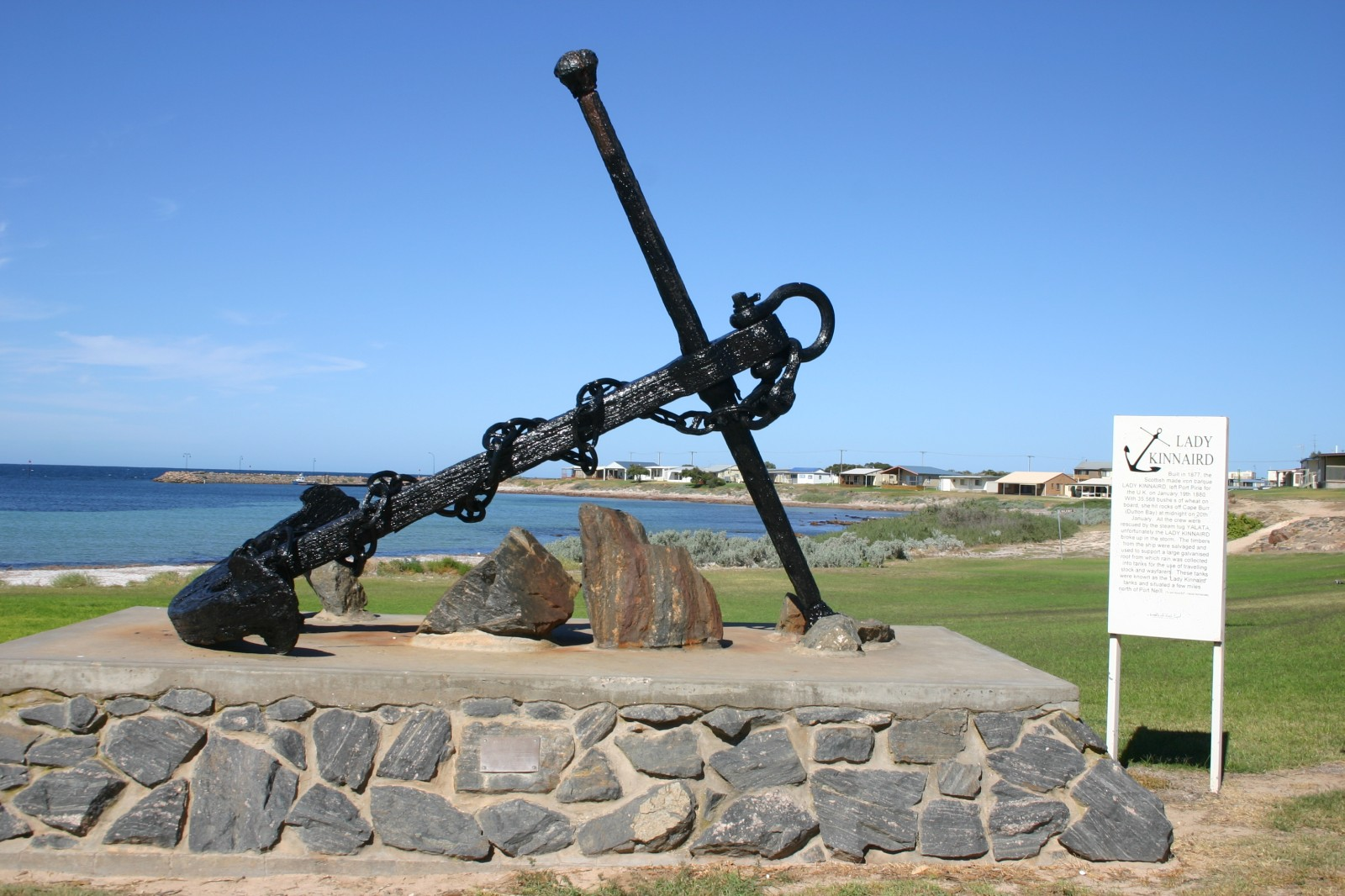
Lady Kinnaird anchor on the foreshore at Port Neill. Recovered by the SUHR & others in 1979.

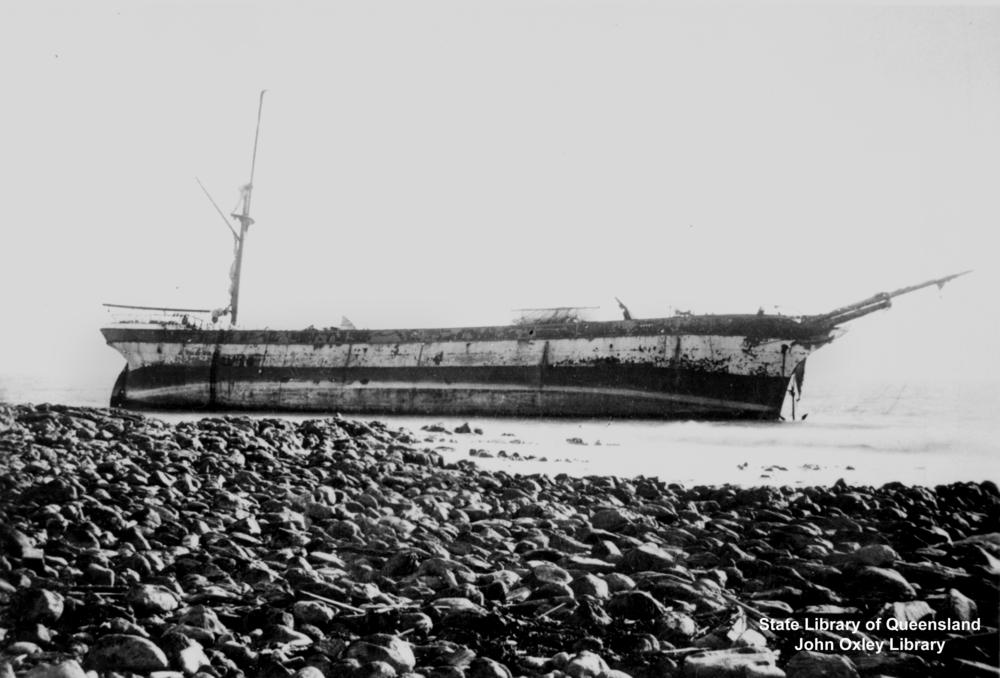
The remains of Aagot, not long after it was wrecked in 1907. Wrecksite surveyed by the SUHR in 1983.

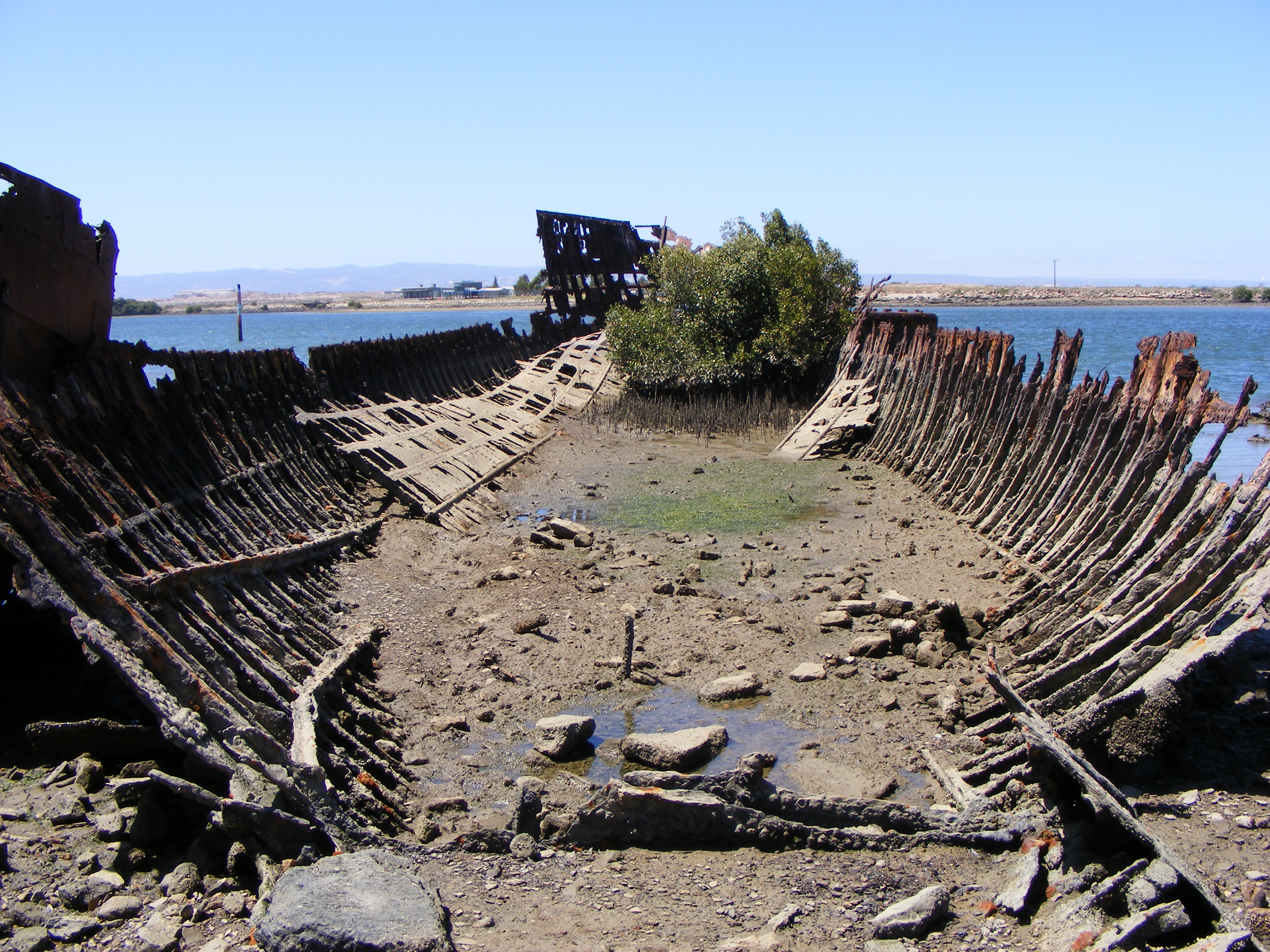
Wreck of Sunbeam, Built in 1857 and abandoned in the ships graveyard in 1910. In the North Arm of the Port River, Adelaide, South Australia. Wreck Site surveyed by the SUHR in 1989 & 1990.

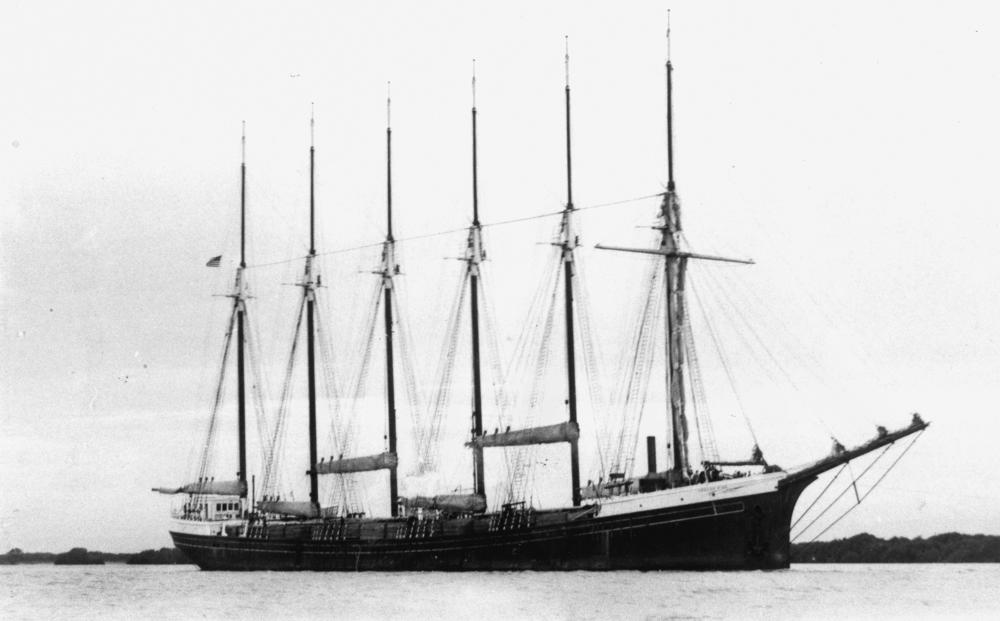
Dorothy H Sterling (formerly Oregon Pine). Wreck site surveyed by the SUHR in 1989 & 1990.

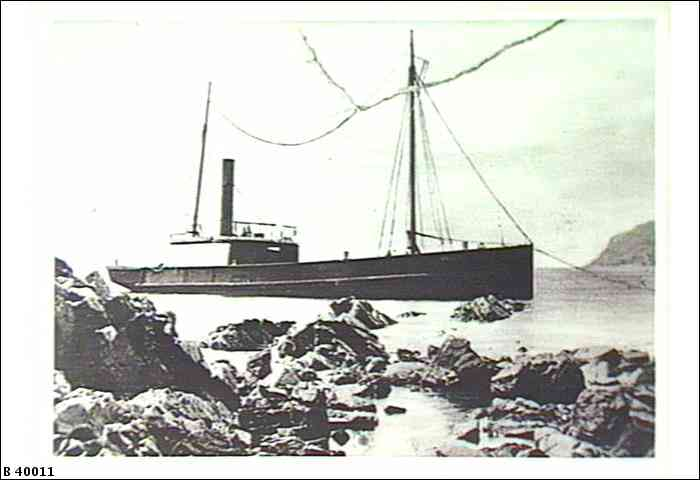
The trawler Ellen wrecked on Morgan Beach. Wreck site surveyed by the SUHR in 2003.

== See also ==
- David Godwin Burchell – Australian businessman
- Peter Christopher (Australian author) – Australian author
- Margaret Rule – British archaeologist who led the Mary Rose project
