= Birr =

Birr may refer to:

== Places ==
- Birr, County Offaly, a town in Ireland
  - Birr Castle, a castle in Birr, Ireland
  - King's County Birr, a 1885–1918 UK parliamentary constituency in what is now County Offaly
- Birr, Ontario, a community in Middlesex Centre, Ontario, Canada
- Birr, Switzerland, a municipality in Aargau, Switzerland

== People ==
- Jim Birr (1916–2006), American professional basketball player
- Kevin Birr (born 1969), American curler
- Todd Birr (born 1968), American curler

== Other ==
- Ethiopian birr, the currency of Ethiopia
- Birr RFC, a rugby club in the Irish town
- Synod of Birr, in the Irish town, in 697
- Birr Aerodrome, near the Irish town

== See also ==
- Bier (disambiguation)
- Burr (disambiguation)
