= South Australian Archaeology Society =

Avocational archaeology organisation operating in South Australia

- Abbreviation: SAAS
- Predecessor: Society for Underwater Historical Research
- Formation: March 12, 2012; 14 years ago
- Type: NGO
- Legal status: Incorporated association
- Purpose: Avocational Archaeology
- Region served: South Australia
- Website: www.facebook.com/groups/suhrsa/members/

The South Australian Archaeology Society was an avocational archaeology organisation operating in South Australia. It evolved from the Society for Underwater Historical Research which was renamed in March 2012 as part of a plan to create an organisation with a broader community base in archaeological practice.

The Society was de-registered as an incorporated group in September 2024. It continues solely as a Facebook group, along with a privately-owned blog.
