= Cape Burr =

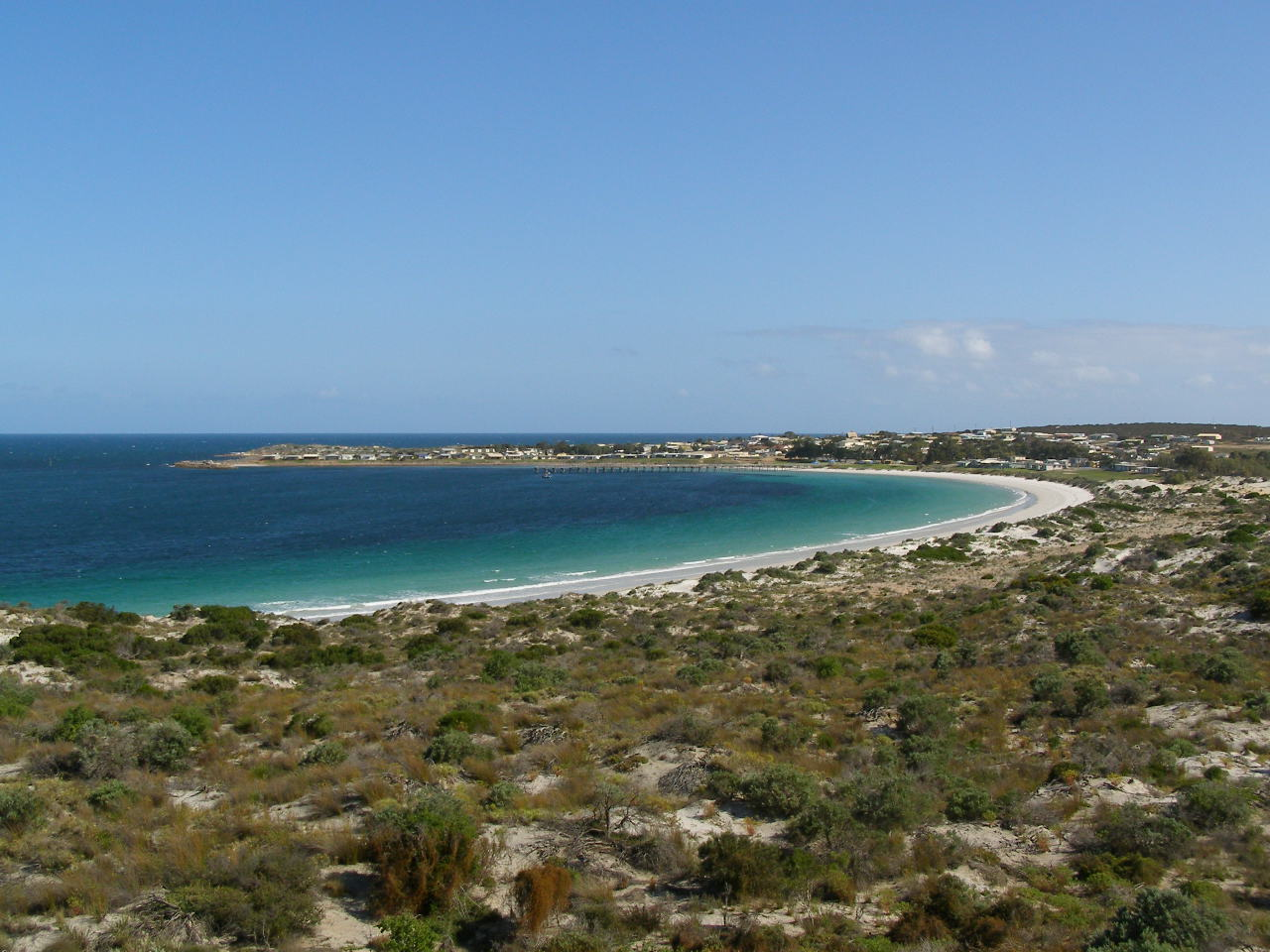
- Port Neill, South Australia on the north coast of Cape Burr

- Coordinates: 34°7′22″S 136°21′24″E
- Country: Australia
- State: South Australia

Cape Burr is a headland in the Australian state of South Australia on the east coast of Eyre Peninsula in the gazetted locality of Port Neill about 0.5 kilometres (0.31 miles) east of the locality's town centre. It is the southern extremity of Dutton Bay.

The cape is one of several geographical features named during the first land-based European exploration of the eastern coast of Eyre Peninsula in 1840 by George Gawler, the Governor of South Australia. It was named after Thomas Burr, the Deputy Surveyor General of South Australia, who was one of those in the party accompanying Gawler.

== See also ==
- Burr (disambiguation)
- Lady Kinnaird
