= Peter Christopher (Australian author) =

Australian author

Peter Christopher OAM
- Born: 1948 (age 77–78); Cyprus
- Writing career
- Language: English, Greek

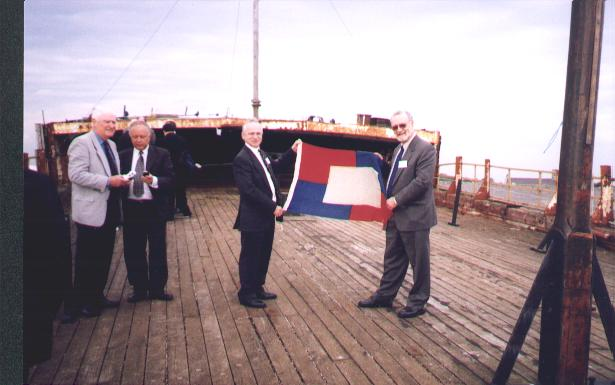
South Australian and Sunderland delegates on board the City of Adelaide during the conference convened by The Duke of Edinburgh (Peter Christopher is standing on the right hand side)

Peter Christopher, OAM, (born 1948, Cyprus) is an Australian author and photographer who writes about shipwrecks and riverboats. He is also a Director of the not for profit organisation, Clipper Ship City of Adelaide Ltd (CSCOAL), set up to save the 1864 clipper ship, City of Adelaide.

== Career ==
Christopher is the author of seven books, co-author of another and co-editor of another. Australia's large collection of original operating paddle steamers has been the subject of three decades of research by him, and hence the subject of two of his seven books.

Since 1967, Christopher has been an active scuba diver and volunteer maritime archaeologist who has visited and documented wrecks in South Australia (SA) in particular, but also around Australia. Christopher's contribution to maritime archaeology was recognised by an Award presented to him by the Australian Government in 1982 and by the award of a life membership by the Society for Underwater Historical Research in 2000.

In 1973, Christopher was a member of the South Australian Government's inquiry into scuba diving deaths in fresh water sink-holes and underwater caves in the south east of SA. The Report of the Committee "appointed to investigate safety precautions for Scuba Divers in Fresh Water Sink Holes and Underwater Caves" which was presented to the Government in January 1974 essentially recommended non-legislative response to the problem. The subsequent voluntary program of regulation via diver training and certification has been carried out by the Cave Divers Association of Australia. The success of the program is evident with nearly four decades of low fatality cave diving following the implementation of the Report's recommendations.

Christopher is a Justice of the Peace for South Australia.

A 3 Dan black belt, Christopher was the judo instructor from 1970 to 1973 of the Legacy Junior Boys Club.

He is not a full-time author; he worked as a senior Trade Union official, with his role until mid June 2015 being the Chief Industrial Officer of the Public Service Association of South Australia. He retired to focus on a volunteer role developing a seaport village for the historic 1864 clipper ship "City of Adelaide' in Port Adelaide's inner harbour.

== Bibliography ==
- Shores of Tragedy: shipwrecks of South Australia. (Christopher.P) (ISBN 0731613481) OCLC: 27527347, published by Peter Christopher in 1987, details the ten most commonly dived wrecks in South Australia.
- Divers Guide to South Australia. (Christopher.P) (ISBN 0958804400) OCLC: 27626745 published by Peter Christopher in 1988
- " ...to save the lives of strangers" (Famous Shipwrecks of South Australia) (Christopher.P) (ISBN 0958804419) OCLC: 27626764, which was published in 1989, describes the history of SA's most famous wrecks. Its title comes from a newspaper account of the rescue of the survivors of the Admella shipwreck in 1859.
- South Australian Shipwrecks. A Data Base 1802–1989. (Christopher.P), published by the Society for Underwater Historical Research firstly as a paperback in 1990 (ISBN 0 9588006 1 8) and then as a PDF in 2006 (ISBN 0 9588006 2 6) OCLC: 25914190 is a listing of all wrecks during that period.
- Paddlesteamers and Riverboats of the River Murray. (Christopher.P), published by Axiom, 2000 (ISBN 978-1-86476-040-8) OCLC: 222744595.
- Let's go for a Dive, 50 years of the Underwater Explorers Club of SA, edited by Peter Christopher with Nicholas Cundell and published in 2004 (ISBN 0958804427) OCLC: 223893318.
- Australian Riverboats. A Pictorial History. (Christopher.P), published by Axiom, 2006 (ISBN 9781864764741) OCLC: 224952174.
- Australian Shipwrecks. A Pictorial History. (Christopher.P), published by Axiom, 2009 (ISBN 9781864765885) OCLC: 458275141.
- Clipper Ship City of Adelaide - Fun, facts & figures. (Reardon.M & Christopher.P) 2018 (ISBN 9781864768244)
