= Burr, West Virginia =

Unincorporated community in West Virginia, United States

- Unincorporated community
- Location within West Virginia Location within the United States
- Coordinates: 38°03′56″N 80°06′18″W
- Country: United States
- State: West Virginia
- County: Pocahontas
- Elevation: 2,989 ft (911 m)
- Time zone: UTC-5 (Eastern (EST))
  - Summer (DST): UTC-4 (EDT)
- Area codes: 304 & 681
- GNIS feature ID: 1728019

Burr is an unincorporated community in Pocahontas County, West Virginia, United States. Burr is 7.5 miles (12.1 km) southeast of Hillsboro.
