= Burr (given name) =

Burr is a masculine given name which may refer to the following people:

- Burr Baldwin (1922–2007), American college and professional football player
- Burr Caswell (1807–1896), American frontiersman
- Burr Chamberlain (1877–1933), American college football player and head coach
- Burr DeBenning (1936–2003), American character actor
- Burr H. Duval (1809–1836), the commander of the Kentucky Mustangs, a volunteer unit which fought in the Texas Revolution
- Burr Harrison (1904–1973), American politician
- Burr W. Jones (1846–1935), American politician, jurist and lawyer
- Burr McIntosh (1862–1942), American lecturer, photographer, film studio owner, silent film actor, author, publisher of Burr McIntosh Monthly, reporter and a pioneer in the early film and radio business
- Burr Plato (c. 1844 – 1905), escaped African-American slave and Canadian politician
- Burr Shafer (1899–1965), American cartoonist
- Burr Steers (born 1965), American actor, screenwriter and director, nephew of writer Gore Vidal
- Burr Tillstrom (1917–1985), American puppeteer, creator and sole puppeteer of the television show Kukla, Fran and Ollie
- Burr Williams (1909–1981), American National Hockey League player
