= Bur, Iran =

Bur بور
- Village
- Location within Iran
- Coordinates: 34°48′33″N 47°58′39″E
- Country: Iran
- Province: Hamadan
- County: Asadabad
- Bakhsh: Central
- Rural District: Darbandrud

Population (2006)
  - Total: 27
- Time zone: UTC+3:30 (IRST)
  - Summer (DST): UTC+4:30 (IRDT)

Bur (Persian: بور, also Romanized as Būr) is a village in Darbandrud Rural District, in the Central District of Asadabad County, Hamadan Province, Iran. At the 2006 census, its population was 27, in 4 families.
