= Frank A. Burr =

American newspaper reporter and author

- Born: 1843; Grand Rapids, Michigan, U.S.
- Died: January 1894 (aged 50–51)
- Occupation(s): Newspaper reporter, author

Frank A. Burr (1843 – January 1894) was an American newspaper reporter and author. He was a staff correspondent for The Philadelphia Press. He wrote a book about James Addams Beaver and another with Richard J. Hinton about Phillip Sheridan.

He was born in Grand Rapids, Michigan. He spent time with Chippewa during his youth. His father Ezra D. Burr was an M.D., probate court judge, and editor.

He was a printer. He served in the Civil War. Russell A. Alger was his company's captain.

He contributed to the newspaper The Daily Register. He was also a Pennsylvania Republican.

Burr died in January 1894.

== Books ==
- The Life and Achievements of James Addams Beaver
- "Little Phil" and his troopers, co-authored by Richard J. Hinton, J. A. & R. A. Reid (1888)
- A new, original and authentic record of the life and deeds of General U.S. Grant containing a full history of his early life; his record as a student at the West Point military academy; his gallantry in the Mexican War; his honorable career as a business man in St. Louis and Galena: his eminent services to his country in our great Civil War; his election to the presidency; his able and patriotic administration; his tour around the world, with an account of the great honors shown him by the emperors, kings and rulers of all nations; his lingering sickness, heroism in suffering, and his pathetic death, co-authored with John Philip Newman, J.S. Robertson (1885)
