= Bur, Yemen =

Bur بور
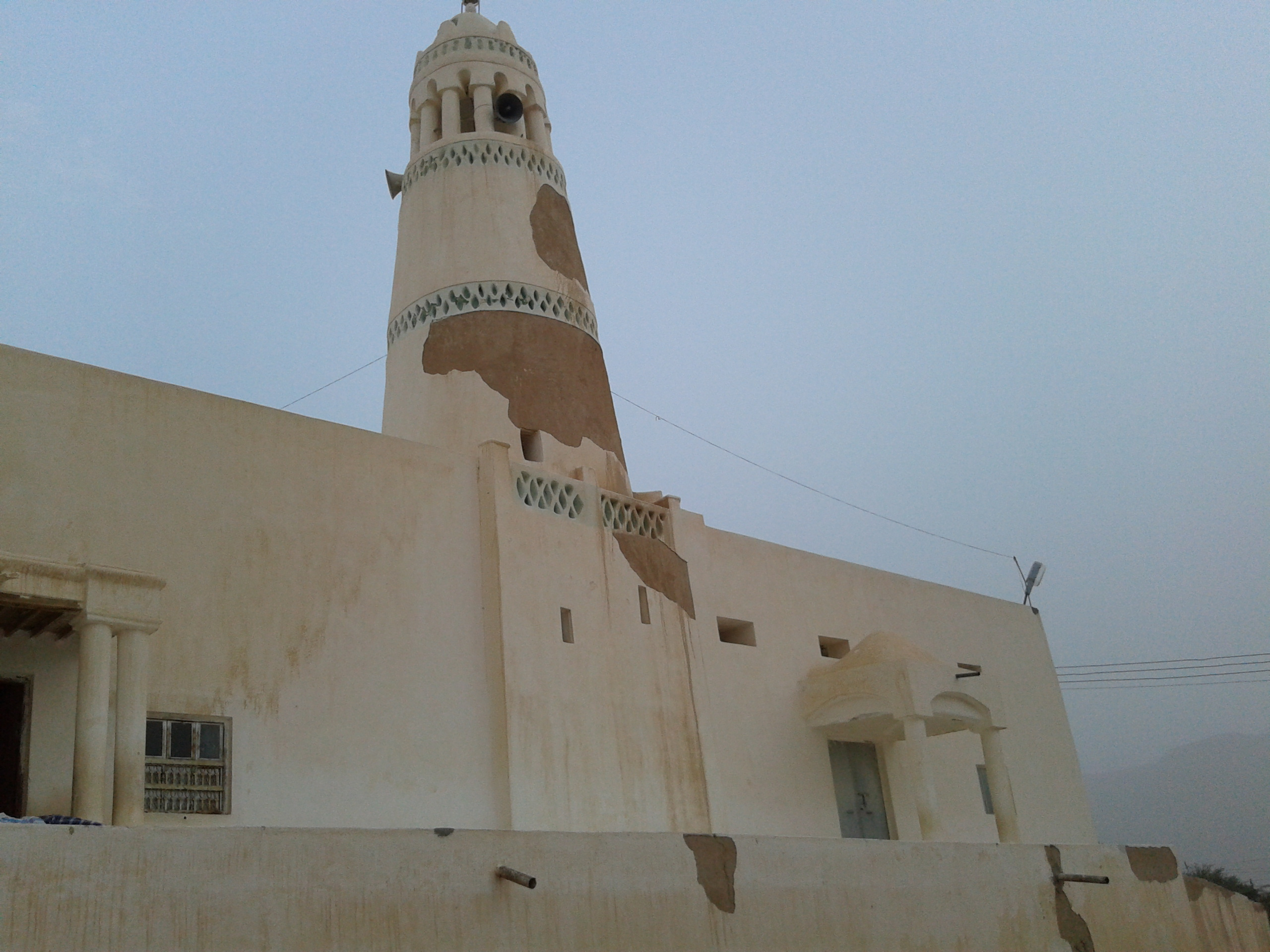
- Country: Yemen
- Governorate: Hadhramaut
- Time zone: UTC+3 (Yemen Standard Time)

Bur (Arabic: بور) is a village and district in eastern Yemen. It is located in the Hadhramaut Governorate.
