= Peter Christopher (American author) =

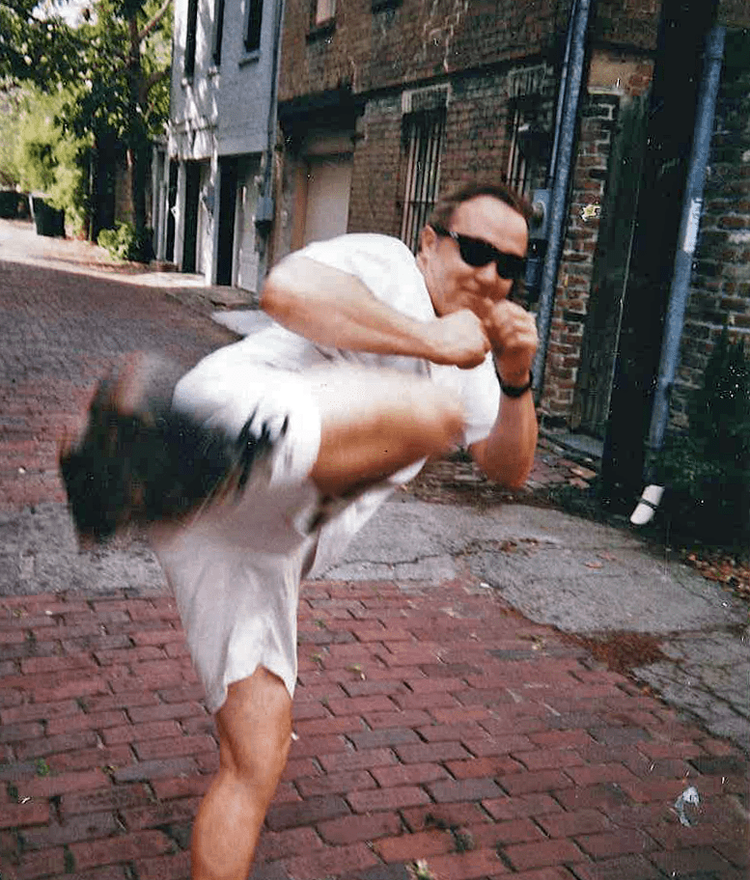
- Born: 1956
- Died: April 15, 2008 (aged 51–52)
- Education: University of Florida; Columbia University
- Known for: Being a highly acclaimed author
- Spouse: Carolyn Altman

Peter Christopher was an associate professor at Georgia Southern University. Christopher was a highly acclaimed author, and wrote numerous books.

Christopher also served as a writer-in-residence for the Writers Voice Workshop, and lectured at the University of Florida, Columbia University, and New York University. He joined the faculty of the Georgia Southern Writing and Linguistics Department in 1998, where he helped build the creative writing program. He also was a guest teacher for the dangerous writers in Portland, OR.

Christopher died on April 15, 2008, due to liver cancer.

== Bibliography ==
=== Collections ===
- Campfires of the Dead (1989)
- Campfires of the Dead and the Living (2022)

== Education ==
- Masters in Fine Arts from the University of Florida in 1996.
- Bachelors in Literature from Columbia University in 1978.

== Awards ==
Christopher received a National Endowment for the Arts Fellowship in Literature.
