= Frances Burr =

American artist

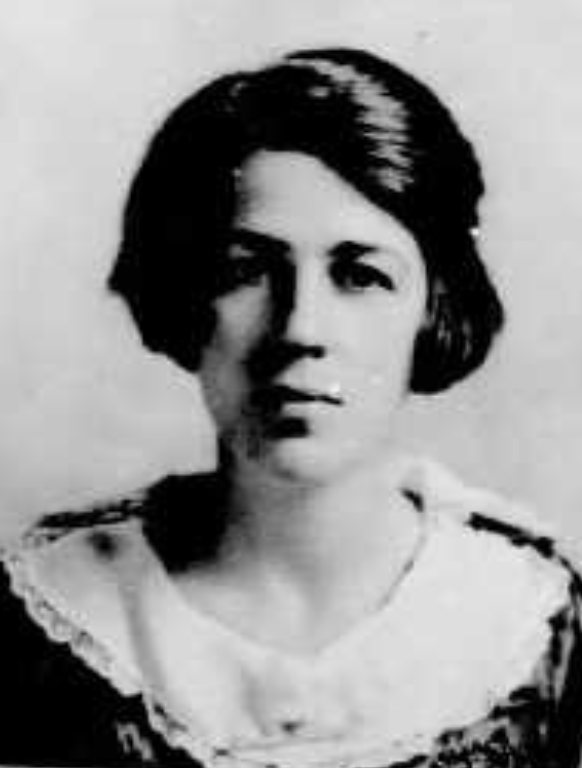
- Frances Burr Ely, from her 1922 passport application
- Born: November 24, 1890; Boston, Massachusetts, U.S.
- Died: March 28, 1974 (aged 83); Santa Fe, New Mexico, U.S.
- Other names: Frances Burr Ely, Frances Burr Reynolds
- Occupations: Artist, draughtsman, astronomer, athlete, pilot

Frances Burr Ely Reynolds (November 24, 1890 – March 28, 1974) was an American artist, known for her fantasy medieval bas-relief murals in gesso. Burr made navigation and target charts for the American military during World War II, and after the war made astronomical charts. She was also a licensed pilot, a skier and a diver.

== Early life and education ==
Burr was born in Boston, and raised in Lawrence, Nassau County, New York, the daughter of Winthrop Motley Burr Sr. and Frances Page Burr. Her father was a member of the governing committee of the New York Stock Exchange, and her mother was a clubwoman on Long Island. Her uncle was Massachusetts politician and banker Isaac Tucker Burr Jr. Both of her brothers died in 1923. She studied with the Art Students League of New York, and with Charles Webster Hawthorne.

== Career ==
=== Murals and other art ===
After a trip to Italy in 1922, Burr painted detailed murals in gesso, featuring fantasy medieval scenes, on the walls of her own home. She exhibited at the Ehrich Galleries in Brooklyn in 1924. Her "carved and painted panels" titled "The Battle of Great Strokes" and "Upon Adventure Embarked" were also part of the Brooklyn Art Museum in 1926 as part of the National Association of Women Painters and Sculptors show. Her work was exhibited at the Herron Art Institute in Indianapolis and at the Minneapolis Institute of Art in 1927. An Indiana reviewer found her work "intensely interesting" and "well-thought-out" but thought the overall effect like that of "an assemblage of toys grouped upon a flat surface". She spoke about her work in Honolulu in 1928. She painted herself and her son into one of the murals, as onlookers at a battlefield.

Burr's "The Battle of Hastings" panel was reproduced as a full-page feature in the Chicago Tribune in 1932. Also in 1932, one of her paintings was the cover illustration of Country Life magazine. In 1948 and 1949, her panels were exhibited at Suffolk Museum in Stony Brook. In 1955, there was an exhibit of her portraits at Suffolk Museum.

=== Flying, sports, war work, astronomy ===
In 1930, while she was in Nevada for her divorce, Burr completed pilot training, and made several solo flights. She became a competitive skier and diver in mid-life, and was also an active skater. "I've a bug about keeping fit", she said in a 1961 interview. "I think people who exercise regularly can tackle any strenuous activity all their lives". During World War II, she hoped to join the Civil Air Patrol, but instead used her artistic talents working for the U.S. Coast and Geodetic Survey, and making target charts for the U.S. Air Force.

After World War II, she became interested in astronomy, gave evening lectures on the night sky, and made constellation charts for school use. She compiled three volumes of biographies of the people memorialized with lunar place names. She also made engineering illustrations for Grumman Aircraft Corporation, and technical drawings for Republic Aviation Corporation.

== Publications ==
- "An Amateur Climbs the Matterhorn" (1930)

== Personal life ==
Burr married twice. Her first husband was Alfred H. Ely Jr.; they married in 1914 and divorced in 1930. Her second husband was lawyer John Reynolds; they married in 1930, and he died in 1966. She had one son, Alfred Ely III, born 1918. She died in Santa Fe, New Mexico, in 1974, at the age of 83.
