= George Elbert Burr =

American painter (1859–1939)

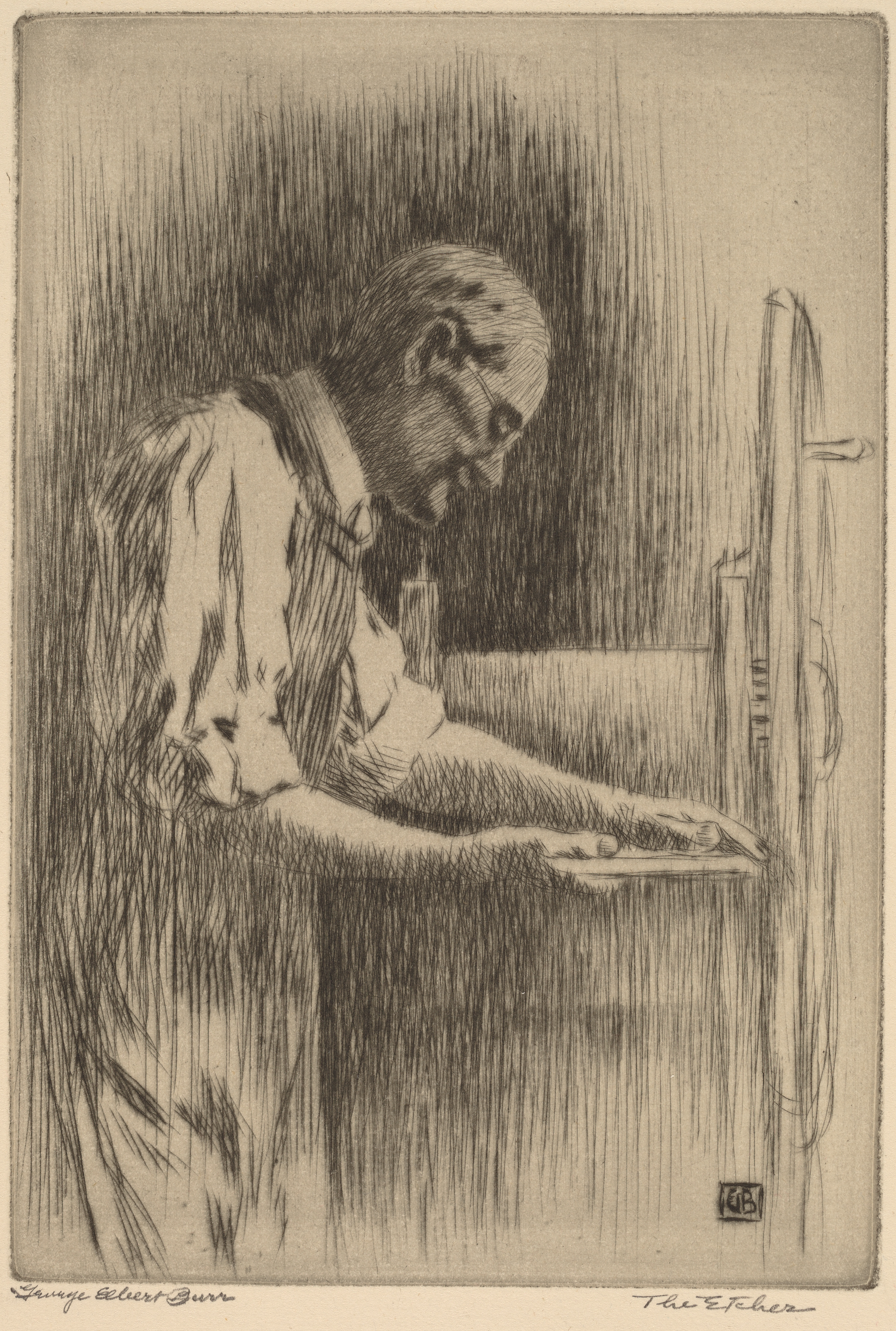
- George Elbert Burr, The Etcher
- Born: April 14, 1859; Munroe Falls, Ohio, US
- Died: November 17, 1939 (aged 80); Phoenix, Arizona, US
- Education: Chicago Academy of Design
- Known for: Painting, Printmaking, Drypoint, Watercolors, Etching
- Patrons: Metropolitan Museum of Art

George Elbert Burr (April 14, 1859 – November 17, 1939) was an American printmaker and painter best known for his etchings and drypoints of the desert and mountain regions of the American West.

== Life ==
Burr was born in Munroe Falls, Ohio, and moved with his family to Cameron, Missouri when he was 10 years old, where his father opened a hardware store. Having been tutored by his mother, Burr left to study at the Chicago Academy of Design in December 1878, but returned home in April 1879 for good; it would be his only formal training.

Burr worked at his father's store, yet never abandoned his art. He enjoyed success early, providing illustrations for Harper's, Scribner's Magazine, Frank Leslie's Weekly, and The Cosmopolitan. In 1892, he began a four-year project illustrating a catalog of Heber R. Bishop's collection of jade antiquities for the Metropolitan Museum of Art. This project, producing etchings of over a thousand artifacts, paid well enough for Burr to embark on an extended tour of Europe upon its completion with his wife. Over the next five years, as they traveled in Italy, Germany, and the British Isles, Burr amassed sketches and watercolors that would provide the source material for his copper plate etchings of European scenes.

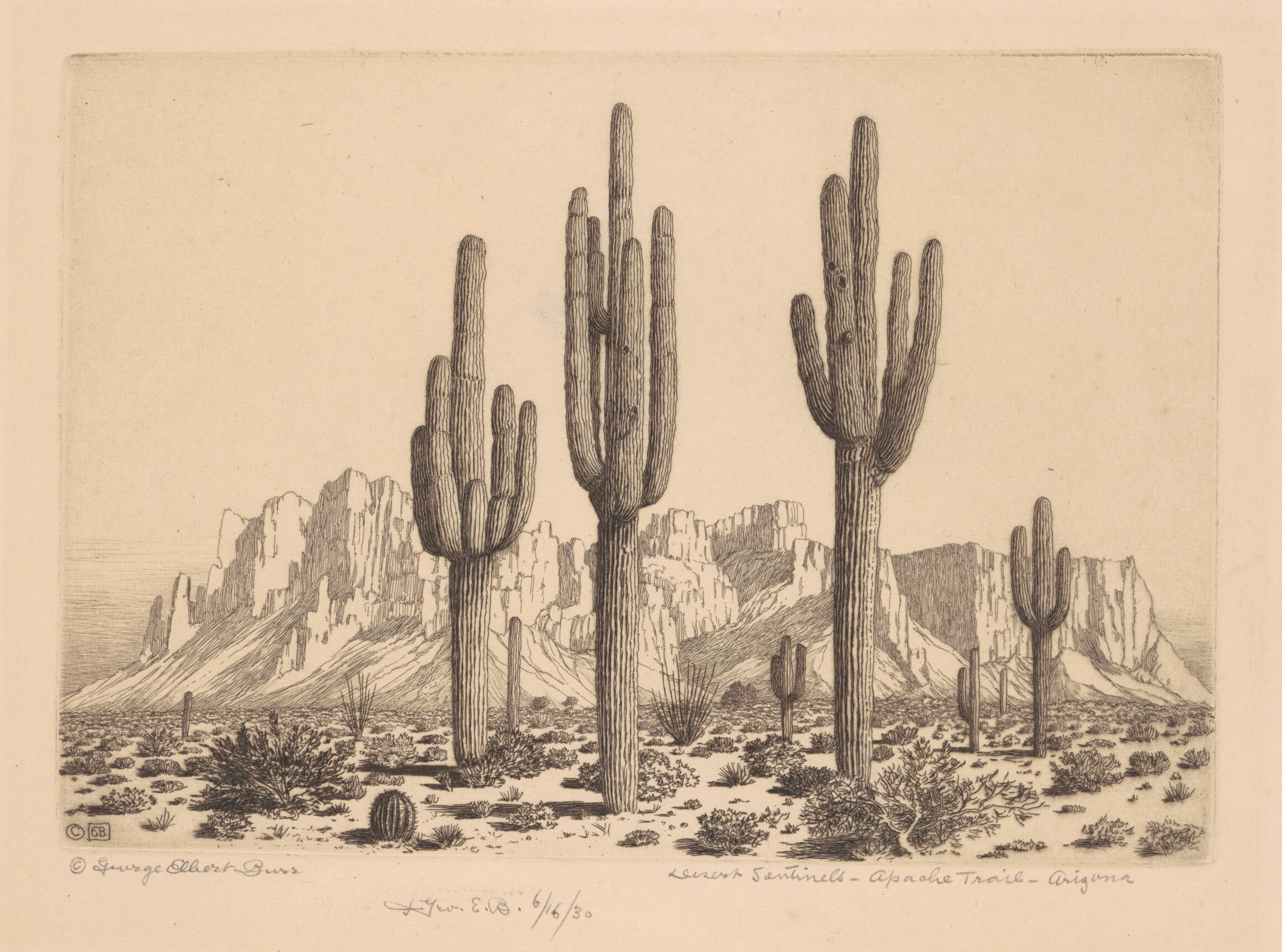
Desert Sentinels

A few years after his return to America, an attack of the flu prompted Burr to move to Denver for the benefit of his health. It was there, during summers spent in a cabin studio in a steep wooded canyon with panoramic views of the Rocky Mountains, that Burr began to concentrate on the work that made him famous. In 1910, he built a brick house and studio at 1325 Logan Street in Denver. The building was purchased by the Denver Woman's Press Club, which continues to own and operate it as a clubhouse. In 1924, the Burrs settled in Phoenix, Arizona, where he would remain for the rest of his life. The change of scenery gave him the opportunity to round out his oeuvre of Western landscapes with expansive views of the Sonoran and Mojave deserts.

Today George Elbert Burr is widely considered to be one of the finest of the early 20th-century American etchers. His prints are in a number of prominent collections including the Smithsonian American Art Museum, the British Museum, the Harvard Art Museums, the French National Print Collection, Luxembourg Gallery, Victoria and Albert Museum, the New York Public Library, Brooklyn Museum, Museum of Northern Arizona. and the Congressional Library in Washington, D.C.

== Sources ==
- Seeber, Louise Combes (1971). George Elbert Burr, 1859-1939; catalogue raisonné and guide to the etched works with biographical and critical notes. Flagstaff, Ariz: Northland Press. ISBN 0-87358-067-2.
