= Lady Kinnaird (1877) =

Barque built in 1877 at Dundee, Scotland

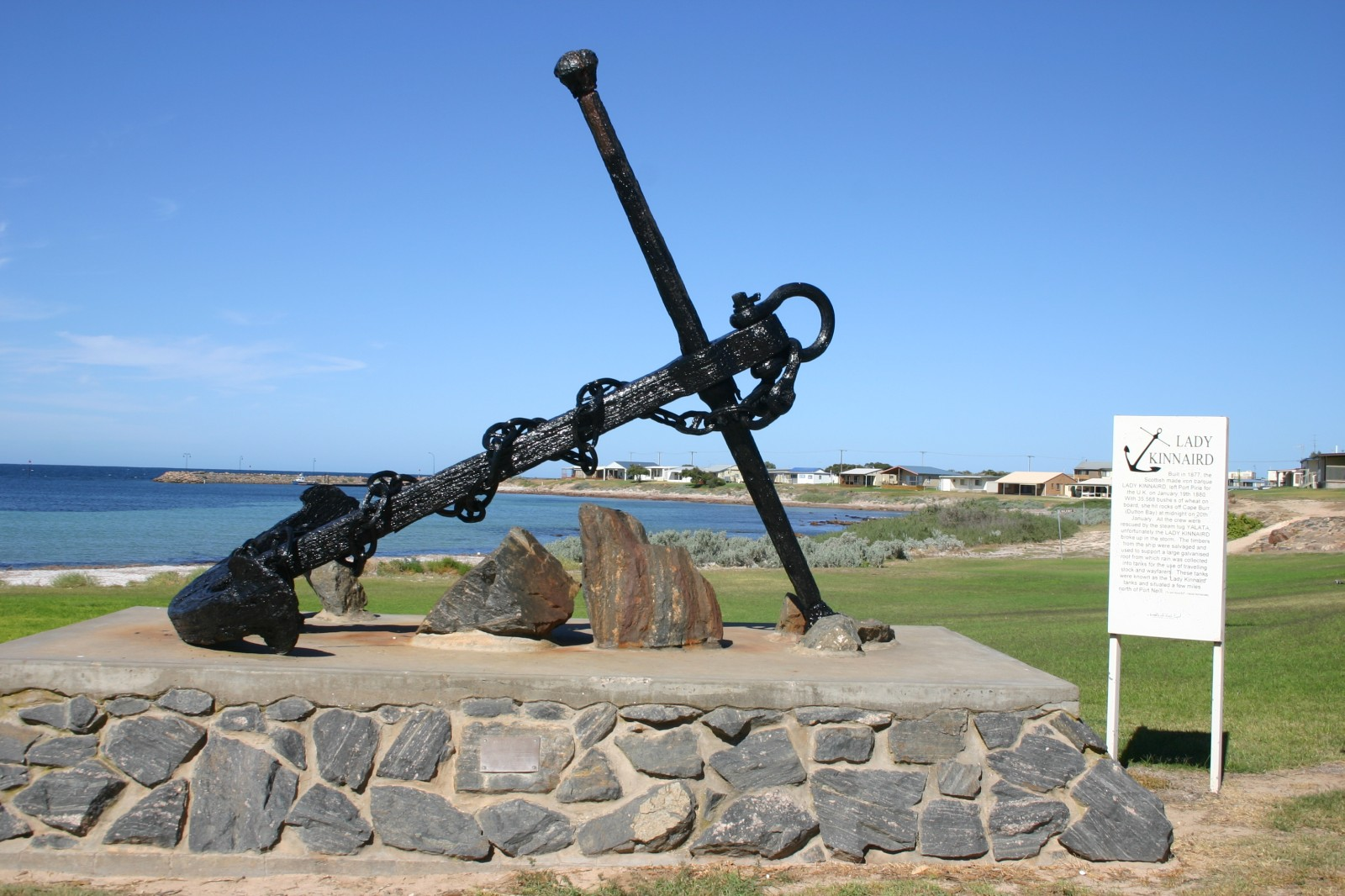
- Lady Kinnaird anchor on the foreshore at Port Neill

History
- Name: Lady Kinnaird
- Operator: W.B. Ritchie
- Builder: Brown & Simpson
- Yard number: 34
- Home port: Dundee
- Fate: Ran aground near Cape Burr on 21 January 1880
- Notes: Historic shipwreck

General characteristics
- Type: Barque
- Tons burthen: 680
- Length: 190 ft 0 in (57.91 m)
- Beam: 30 ft 4 in (9.25 m)
- Depth of hold: 17 ft 8 in (5.38 m)

Lady Kinnaird was a three masted barque which was built in 1877 at Dundee, Scotland by Brown & Simpson for W.B. Ritchie. She operated between the United Kingdom and the Australian colonies. She was lost after running aground in Spencer Gulf south of Cape Burr on the east coast of Eyre Peninsula in South Australia early on 21 January 1880. Her main anchor was recovered from her wreck site in 1979 and was placed on display in the nearby town of Port Neill in January 1880 as part of the commemoration of the centenary of her loss.

== Origins ==
Lady Kinnaird was built at Dundee in 1877 by Brown & Simpson for W.B. Ritchie. She was of iron construction and had three masts. She was reported as having at least one sister ship - Lord Kinnaird.

== Career ==
Lady Kinnaird had a career sailing between ports in the United Kingdom and ports in the Australian colonies which was shortened by her loss after running aground on 21 January 1880. On all of her voyages, the master was Alexander Laws.

Date	Description of voyage
11 April 1877	Depart Dundee for Adelaide under the command of Laws, arrive 17 July 1877 with cargo with total declared value of £7,800. The ship's carpenter, John Braumer, was lost when he ‘was washed overboard during a heavy gale whilst crossing the Southern Ocean.’
14 September 1877	Depart Adelaide for London with a cargo of 1,058 bales of wool, arrive 1 January 1878
3 March 1878	Depart for Brisbane, arrive 20 June 1878
16 July 1878	Depart for Newcastle in ballast under the command of Laws, arrive 21 July 1878
6 August 1878	Depart for Manila with a cargo of 295 tons of coal, arrive 6 October 1878
not known	Depart Manilla for the United Kingdom.
18 July 1879	Depart from Liverpool for Adelaide under the command of Laws, arrived 24 October 1879 with three passengers and cargo.
15 December 1879	Depart for Port Pirie
19 January 1880	Depart Port Pirie for London with a cargo of wheat, run aground near Cape Burr early on 21 January 1880

== The wrecking event ==
Lady Kinnaird, under the command of Laws, left Port Pirie at 4.00 am on 19 January 1880 bound for the United Kingdom with a cargo about 8400 bags of wheat, being shipped on behalf of John Darling & Son. During the afternoon of 20 January, the wind direction changed to the south along with an increase in speed. At 8.00 pm, the wind conditions were described as ‘furious squalls’. The barque continued its course into the southerly wind. At about midnight, when about to do a planned change of course to the east or the southeast, it was discovered that the barque was close to the west coast of Spencer Gulf. As the barque did not respond to a change of course, the main anchor was released but its cable failed and before a second anchor could be released, the barque ran aground. At sunrise, the crew realised that the barque had run aground south of Cape Burr about 0.75 miles (1.21 kilometres) from the shore. The crew exited the wrecked vessel without loss of life and made way in lifeboats to the nearby shore where a camp was set up.

== Aftermath ==
The Marine Board of South Australia held an inquiry in the loss of the barque and on 9 February 1880, found the master, Alexander Laws, to be negligent. A further inquiry presided over by four magistrates was convened where evidence from expert witnesses was heard. On 25 February 1880, the inquiry found Captain Laws not guilty of the charge of negligence.

Timber recovered from the wreck site is reported as being used to build a water store known as Lady Kinnaird Tanks which adjoined the current alignment of Lincoln Highway about 6.6 kilometres (4.1 miles) north of Port Neill.

In 1911, the submerged rock (known as Lady Kinnaird Rock in some sources) which the Lady Kinnaird ran aground on was discovered and marked with a buoy. At low water, it was reported that the minimum depth of water above the rock was 1 fathom (6.0 feet; 1.8 metres) while the published chart advised a depth of 6 fathoms (36 feet; 11 metres). The buoy subsequently ‘disappeared’ in 1922 and was not replaced.

== Recovery of the main anchor ==
In 1978, recreational divers living in Port Neil contacted the Society for Underwater Historical Research (SUHR) for advice about and for possible assistance with the raising of the main anchor from the wreck site and conserving it for public display as part of the commemorations planned for the centenary of the loss of the barque in 1980. In November 1978, the SUHR and local divers surveyed the wreck and located the anchor in 11 metres (36 feet) depth of water. In March 1979, the SUHR and local divers lifted the main anchor from the wreck site and moved it to shallower water within 100 metres (330 feet) of the beach at Port Neill. In June 1979, the anchor towed ashore and lifted by mobile crane into a tank made of concrete built into the ground specifically for the purpose of conserving the anchor. On 20 January 1980, the conserved anchor was unveiled on a public reserve on the foreshore at Port Neil in front of a crowd estimated as being more than 800 people.

== The present day ==
The wreck site was declared a historic shipwreck under the Historic Shipwrecks Act 1981 (SA) during April 1983. The wreck site is officially located at 34°7′48″S 136°21′36″E. Since 1998, the main anchor has been on the register of local heritage places maintained by the District Council of Tumby Bay on the basis that it is ‘a notable landmark in the area.’

== See also ==
- List of shipwrecks of Australia
- List of shipwrecks in 1880
