= Sarah Edwards (missionary) =

American missionary (1710–1758)

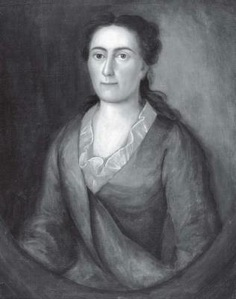
- Sarah Edwards, by John Badger ca. 1740
- Born: January 9, 1710; New Haven, Connecticut, British America
- Died: October 2, 1758 (aged 48); Philadelphia, Pennsylvania, British America
- Spouse: Jonathan Edwards (m. 1727; died 1758)
- Children: 11, including Esther, Jonathan, and Pierpont
- Father: James Pierpont

Sarah Edwards (January 9, 1710 – October 2, 1758) was an American missionary and the wife of theologian Jonathan Edwards. Her husband was initially drawn to her spiritual openness, direct relationship with God, and periods of spiritual ecstasy. As a theological student at Yale, he had longed to have a personal relationship with God. His wife's experiences, similar to those of Saint Teresa of Ávila, profoundly affected his religious life and the formation of the New Light. She was a model of spirituality during the Great Awakening of the early 18th century. Her experiences of religious ecstasy were documented in Jonathan Edwards's work, Some Thoughts Concerning the Present Revival of Religion in New England. She was a Puritan who took her faith very seriously. She raised her eleven children, largely by herself, as Jonathan Edwards focused on sermons and books. Among her noted descendants was her grandson, the U.S. vice president Aaron Burr.

== Early life ==
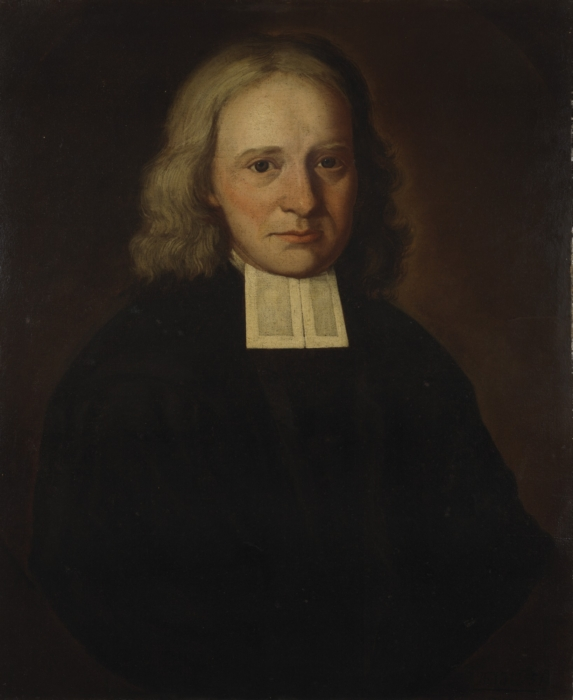
Rev. James Pierpont, 1711

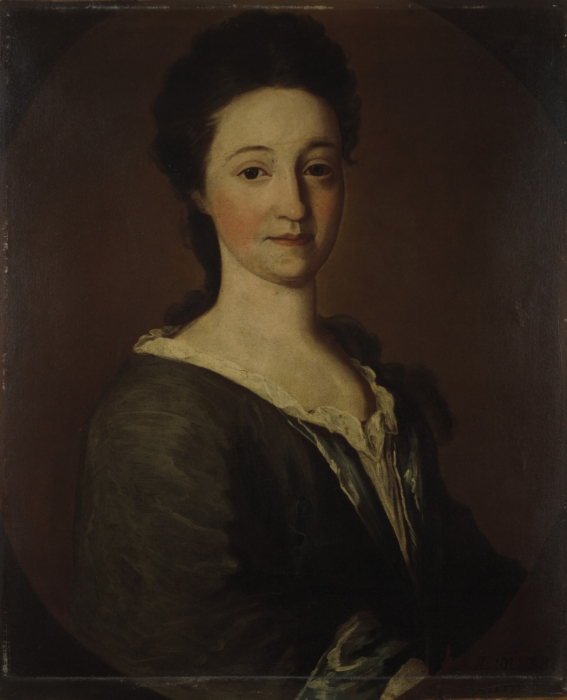
Mary (Hooker) Pierpont, 1711

Sarah Pierpont was born on January 9, 1710, in New Haven, Connecticut. Her parents were James Pierpont and Mary (Hooker) Pierpont, granddaughter of first-generation Puritan Thomas Hooker, who has been considered the founder of Connecticut. Her father was the minister of the First Church of New Haven from 1685 until his death in 1714. He also helped establish what is now Yale University. Educated at home, she was better educated than most women of her day.

By age six, she entered her "heavenly Elysium" where she would “be enraptured by his [Christ's] light and love, have visions of Christ's excellence, and remain in an ecstatic state for up to six hours." This was the first of her "seasons of grace" that were similar to the experiences of Saint Teresa of Ávila.

Pierpont met Jonathan Edwards when she was 13 and he was a divinity student at Yale College. She was well-educated, a good conversationalist, and a beautiful young lady. Edwards appreciated Pierpont's intelligence and valued her opinion during their discussions of religion. He was particularly interested in her personal relationship with God and the openness with which she expressed spiritual delight.

They say there is a young lady in [New Haven] who is beloved of that almighty Being, who made and rules the world, and that there are certain seasons in which this great Being, in some way or other invisible, comes to her and fills her mind with exceeding sweet delight, and that she hardly cares for anything, except to meditate on him - that she expects after a while to be received up where he is, to be raised out of the world and caught up into heaven; being assured that he loves her too well to let her remain at a distance from him always.

— Jonathan Edwards

Sarah's openness helped Jonathan broaden his perspective of religion from primarily an intellectual study to having a personal relationship with God, for which he had longed. He wrote of his admiration for her spiritual awareness and acuity in Apostrophe to Sarah Pierpont.

== Marriage and children ==
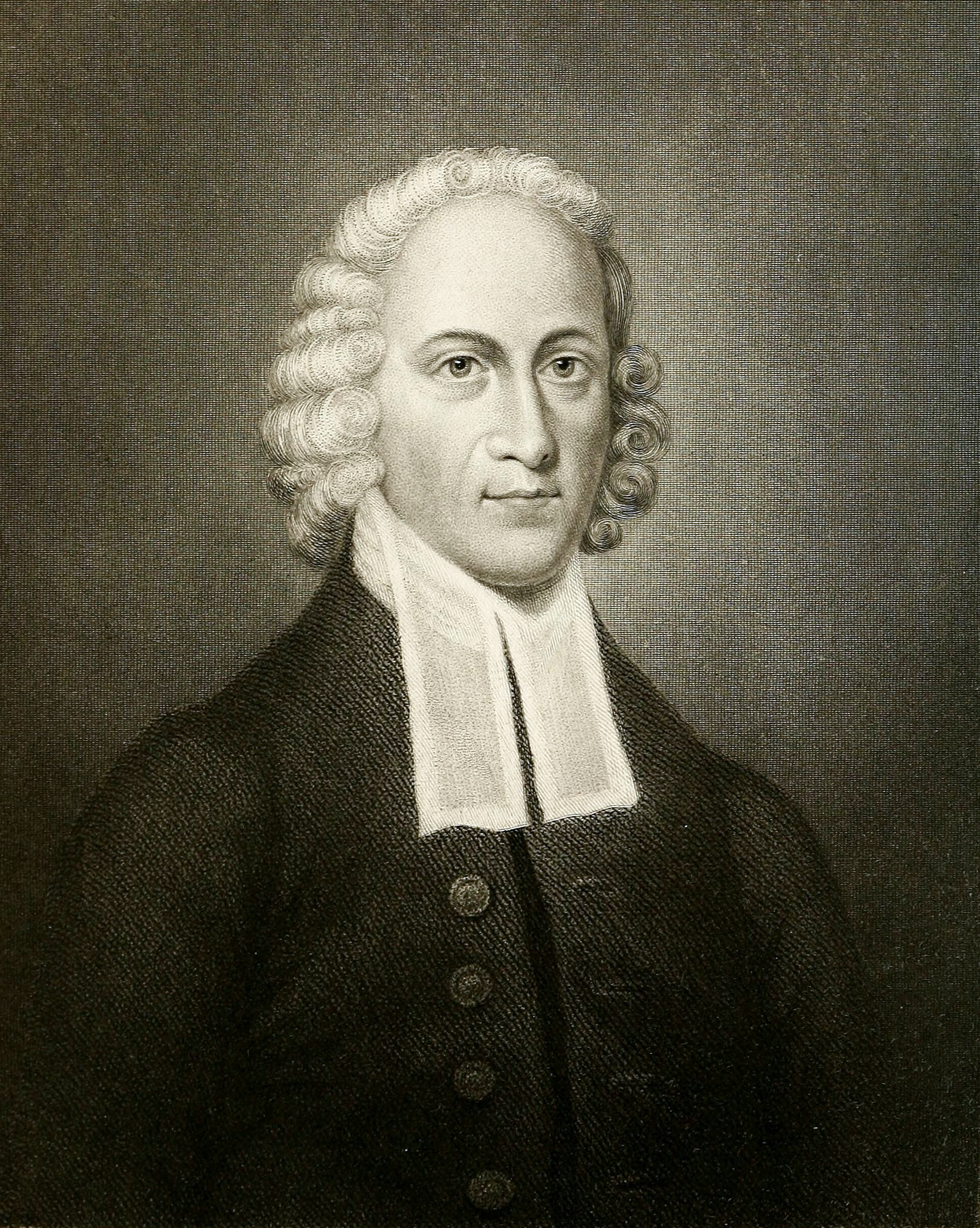
Engraving of Jonathan Edwards

Sarah Pierpont married Jonathan Edwards in July 1727. (Note: She is reported to have married on July 20, 1727, as well as July 28, 1727. A fragment of her wedding dress was saved and became the subject of the poem "Fragment of the Wedding Dress of Sarah Pierpont Edwards" by Susan Howe, published in Souls of the Labadie Tract. The fragment of her wedding dress is held in the Jonathan Edwards collection at the Beinecke Library of the Yale University Library.) Her father, Rev. James Pierpont, officiated at the wedding. The Edwards had eleven children. The first, Sarah, was born in August 1728. The eleventh was born in 1750. Their children were Sarah, Jerusha, Esther, Mary, Lucy, Timothy, Susannah, Eunice, Jonathan, Elizabeth, and Pierpont. Rare for the time, all of her children survived infancy, as well as lived to adulthood.

The couple valued education for their sons and daughters. Jonathan spent an hour each day helping his children with their studies. He also led them in devotions each morning and night. He spent 13 hours of each day writing books on theology and preparing sermons. Sarah was the hands-on parent who raised the children and ran the household, providing an agreeable and pleasant life for her family. The children were raised to treat their parents with great reverence: stand when a parent entered the room, stop speaking when their parents spoke, and not to sit when their parents were standing. She raised her children "as examples of Christian simplicity" and was a model parent within her husband's congregation.

She had an excellent way of governing her children. She knew how to make them obey her cheerfully. She seldom punished them, and spoke to them using gentle and pleasant words.

— A frequent visitor of the Edwards household

Sarah was hospitable, bringing visiting preachers into her home for conversation and meals. Apprentices to Jonathan were treated like members of the family. She had a close relationship with Jonathan, and they prayed together daily. George Whitefield, an evangelist, said of them, "A sweeter couple I have not yet seen."

At times, though, she became overwhelmed and felt unworthy. This was partly due to the pressure that she put upon herself to be held in high esteem by her husband and the community. She also became distressed by the success of visiting ministers when they preached at the church while Rev. Edwards was out of town. Inflation and the increasing family stretched the Edward's family budget. Jonathan asked for increases in his salary but was generally turned down. By 1735, Sarah managed to cope during particularly stressful periods by turning herself over and making a personal covenant to God, which resulted in profound spiritual experiences.

== Great Awakening ==
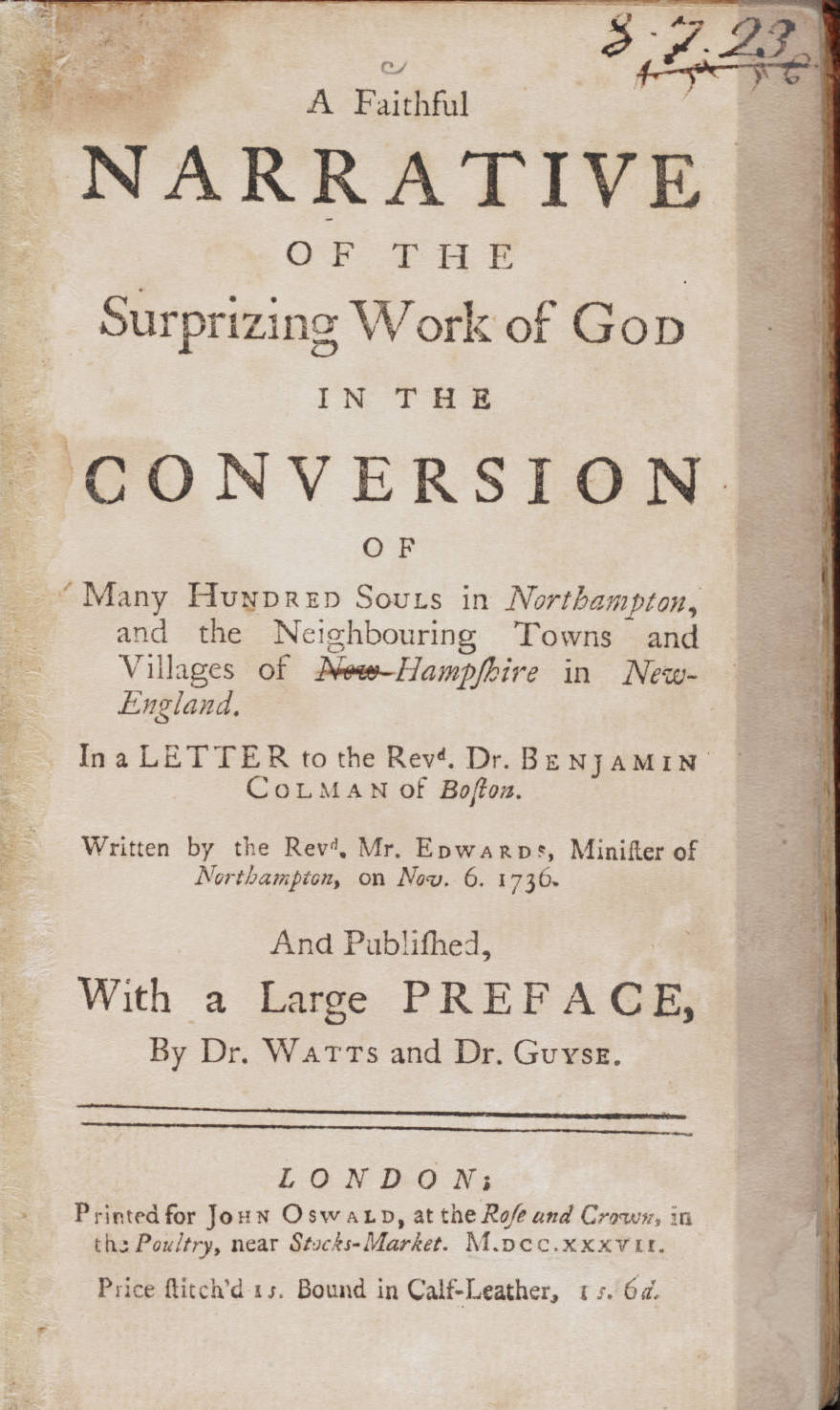
A Faithful Narrative of the Surprizing Work of God, by Jonathan Edwards, 1737

Although his books were popular in Britain and the American colonies, Jonathan had a hard time reaching the younger members of his congregation. In 1734, he preached sermons that captured the attention of the young adults, and one young woman was particularly affected by the feeling of acceptance and forgiveness for her sins. She became a loving and devoted worshipper, which incentivized other young adults. People of all ages found redemption and were found by family members to be reborn. The revival of 300 members of his congregation was the beginning of the Great Awakening that spread throughout Massachusetts and Connecticut. Jonathan wrote of the revival in A Faithful Narrative of the Surprising Work of God in 1737. Jonathan was the leader of the movement, more specifically known as New Light, where personal religious experiences are based on one's heart and reason. It was revolutionary and controversial. There were some ministers that condemned the work, while John Wesley, George Whitefield, and others were inspired by his message. Because New Light is based on one's emotions and reason, "Jonathan Edwards drew on the religious experience of women—his wife included—as models of God's engagement of the affections." Further, she was his partner in his ministry. (Note: According to author William M. Shea, "What Edwards knew, he knew from three sources: (a) books, including the scriptures, the spiritual theology of the Puritan divines and the fathers of the church, and the best science and philosophy he could lay his hands on; (b) close observation of spectacular revivals and less spectacular progress in virtue of his neighbors; and (c) his own and his wife's intimate converse with the Holy Spirit.") His stance was rare for the Puritanical times when women were not considered capable of having deep spiritual experiences because of their "inferior biology".

Sarah, who had been a devoted Christian, was also changed at this time. Beginning in late January 1742, Sarah fell into a depression or what may have been a nervous breakdown when her husband travelled throughout Massachusetts and Connecticut on a preaching tour. She became deeply distressed, and her personality changed dramatically. She became impatient and needful, and she experienced spells of jabbering, fainting, and hallucinating. Her distress was sparked by a remark made by her husband before he left that she had been imprudent in some way and was made worse by her concern about finances and jealousy regarding the men who filled in as minister while her husband was away. She went from feeling the piercing wrath of God for her sinfulness and then transformed in light and love. She then began to have profound spiritual experiences, called religious ecstasy, over nine days. She felt "swallowed up with light and love and a sweet solace, rest and joy of soul that was altogether unspeakable." For uninterrupted hours at a time, she felt

...infinite beauty and amiableness of Christ's person, and the heavenly sweetness of his transcendent love; so that the soul remained in a kind of heavenly Elysium, and did as it were swim in the rays of God's love, like a mote swimming in the beams of the sun, or beams of his light that come in at a window; and the heart was swallowed up in a kind of glow.

— Sarah Edwards' experiences documented anonymously in Some Thoughts Concerning the Present Revival of Religion in New England

Overcome by these experiences, she had physical reactions including the loss of the ability to speak or stand, fainting, leaping for joy, or other physical reactions. She became committed to fighting sinfulness and to feel the intense spiritual awareness. She became stronger emotionally and spiritually with an innate awareness of assured salvation, rather than a continual need to prove that she was worthy.

Jonathan believed that she was brought to the brink of deep sadness to build a stronger personal connection with God. He said, "She was overwhelmed in the light and joy of the love of God," and he considered her to be the "model of a truly Spirit-filled person". He asked her to write down her experiences, which he edited for a work called Some Thoughts Concerning the Present Revival of Religion in New England.

In the July 2021 issue of the William and Mary Quarterly, historians Kenneth P. Minkema, Catherine A. Brekus, and Harry S. Stout published a newly discovered early version of Sarah Pierpont Edwards's "Experiences" that provided a far more graphic account of her "bodily agitations" than appeared in the accounts published by Jonathan Edwards and, later, by Sereno Dwight, suggesting that both Jonathan Edwards and Dwight were deeply concerned about the vividness of Sarah Edwards's original account, which they suppressed from the sanitized versions they offered to the public.

== Missionary ==
In 1750, Jonathan preached that a "profession of godliness" was all that was needed to become a member of the church. This had a political impact, since church membership was the criteria for who could vote in the town. He also changed church policy so that only those who had been saved could take the Lord's Supper. As a result, he was dismissed that year. The family moved to Stockbridge in the Berkshires the following year and worked as missionaries among the Housatonic Indians, or Stockbridge Indians, and he ministered to the small number of colonists. At that time, the French and Indian War was in progress, with frequent raids in the area. Even so, Sarah developed good relationships and was hospitable to members of the community, including the local Native Americans. She cared for soldiers stationed in the barracks.

During the following seven years, the family enjoyed their life near a river and at the foot of the Berkshire Hills, which was in the wilderness at that time. The children explored the area, and Sarah and Jonathan took long walks in the meadows. Besides her devotion to the community, she tended to her children. She directed their academic, music, and religion studies. She led them in prayers and encouraged outdoor sports. Sarah and her daughters sold their needlework to augment the family's income.

== Death and legacy ==
In 1757, Jonathan travelled to visit his daughter Esther Edwards Burr whose husband Rev. Aaron Burr Sr. of a fever in Newark, New Jersey. Burr was president of the College of New Jersey, now called Princeton University. Jonathan accepted the position of president of the college to replace his son-in-law in February 1758. He served as president but died due to inoculation of the smallpox vaccine on March 22, 1758. Esther died in April 1758, and Sarah went to Newark to care for the Burrs' orphaned children, Sally and Aaron Burr.

In late September, Sarah left Princeton for Philadelphia where her orphaned grandchildren had been taken. They began their journey from Philadelphia to Northampton, where she intended to raise them. She became very ill with dysentery, and after five days she died at a friend's house in Philadelphia on October 2, 1758, six months after her husband's death. (Note: She was also said to have died on October 1, 1758.) Their youngest daughter, Elizabeth, died soon after her parents. Her son, Timothy Edwards, raised Sally and Aaron Burr, who in 1800 would become the Vice President of the United States under Thomas Jefferson and kill Alexander Hamilton in a duel. Timothy also raised Pierpont Edwards, Sarah's youngest son who was born in 1750 and orphaned at his parents' deaths in 1758.

Jonathan and Sarah are buried in the Presidents Lot of the Princeton Cemetery. Two stone benches at Jonathan Edwards College at Yale University commemorate Jonathan and Sarah Edwards. Sarah Edwards' bench is carved with the words "Friend, Neighbor, Mother, Wife, and Christian" from her tombstone. Based upon a study of their descendants in 1900, Sarah and Jonathan Edwards progeny are considered "one of the most accomplished families in American history" with one United States Vice President, one controller of the United States Treasury, three state governors, 30 judges, three United States senators, three mayors, 66 physicians, 100 overseas missionaries, numerous ministers, 65 college professors, and 13 college presidents.
