= Esther Edwards Burr =

American writer (1732–1758)

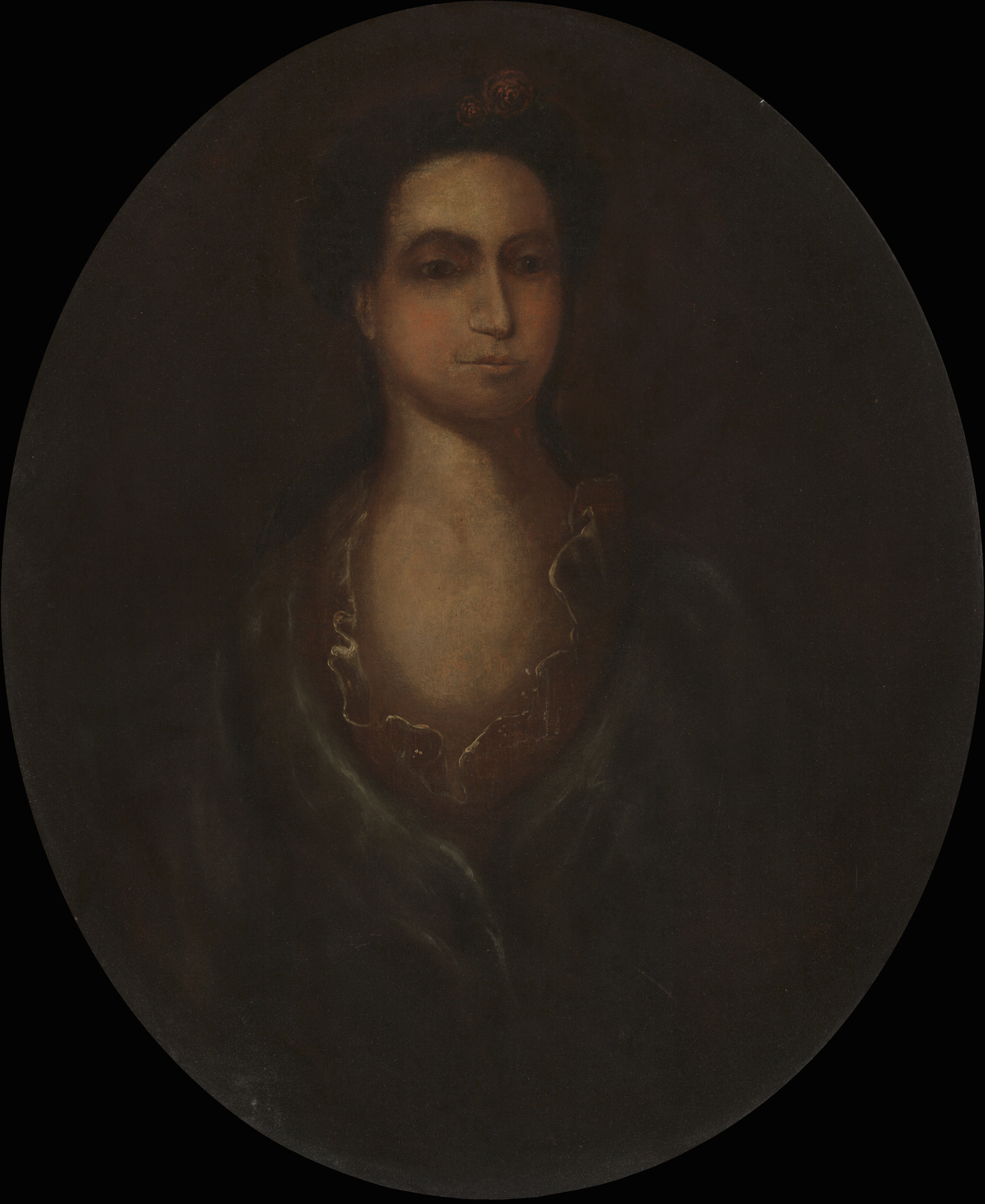
- Born: Esther Edwards; February 13, 1732; Northampton, Province of Massachusetts Bay, then part of British America
- Died: April 7, 1758 (aged 26); Princeton, Province of New Jersey, British America
- Known for: "The Journal of Esther Edwards Burr" 1754–1757
- Spouse: Aaron Burr Sr. (m. 1752; died 1757)
- Children: Aaron Burr Jr.; Sarah Burr
- Parents: Jonathan Edwards; Sarah (Pierpont) Edwards

Esther Edwards Burr (February 13, 1732 – April 7, 1758) was an American diarist who kept a personal journal from October 1754 to 1757, in which she recorded her perspective on current events and her daily activities. Historians consider the journal - first published in its entirety in 1984, as The Journal of Esther Edwards Burr, 1754-1757 - to be an important source in studies of early American history and literature, especially for the insight it provides into the lives of women in Colonial America.

She was the mother of third U.S. Vice President Aaron Burr Jr. and the wife of Princeton University President Aaron Burr Sr., whom she married in 1752.

== Early life and education ==
Esther Edwards was born and raised in Northampton, Province of Massachusetts Bay, the third of eleven children of Sarah (Pierpont) Edwards and prominent Great Awakening preacher Jonathan Edwards. Esther was named after Edwards' mother and grandmother. The Edwards children were encouraged to read the Bible and engage in piety at all times, but they were not kept in the dark about all forms of contemporary, non-religious culture. They were allowed to read novels, if their parents approved of their content, but Jonathan Edwards was still a rather strict father.

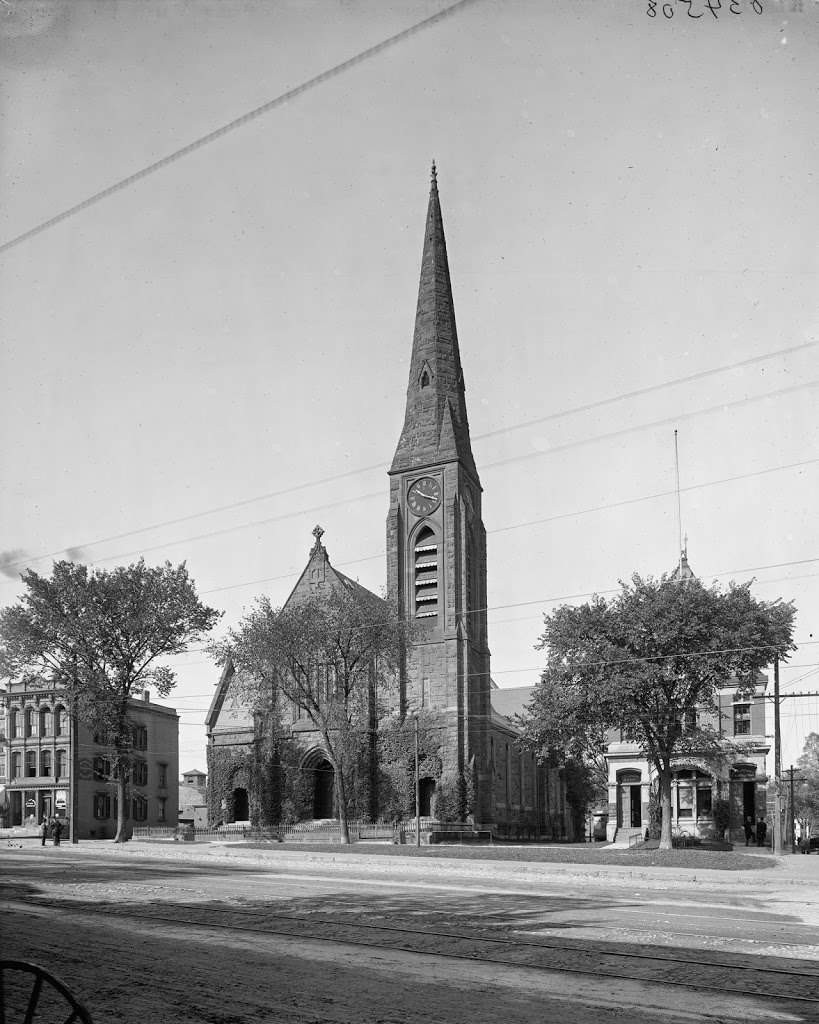
First Church of Northampton, the church Esther attended before moving to Stockbridge.

Esther Edwards was educated at home, and both her parents reportedly encouraged her writing. These writing abilities carried over to her adult life, evident in her journal, consisting of letters sent to her friend.

In 1751, the family moved to Stockbridge, Massachusetts, then a frontier settlement, after Jonathan Edwards split from the First Church of Northampton. Esther was a member of the church at Stockbridge and Northampton, and later the church in Newark.

== Marriage and family ==
In Stockbridge, Esther Edwards met Aaron Burr Sr., then president of the College of New Jersey (now Princeton University). The pair became engaged in May 1752, marrying the following month on June 29, 1752. Their first child, a daughter named Sarah (nicknamed Sally), was born in 1754. Their son Aaron was born in 1756.

The marriage seems to have been a happy one, but Esther's writing suggests that she missed her friends and close-knit family. Her new husband's duties frequently kept him away from home, and Esther found her own responsibilities as the wife of a university president and prominent minister. Esther managed the affairs of the household and hosted many of the scholars of the school at her home, which she thoroughly enjoyed due to being able to listen on the conversations between her husband and their guests about topics of religion. These duties were so draining for her, that sometimes she didn't even have the strength to write a single line of a letter to a friend. Esther kept to a plain style, proudly asserting that she was a "busy housewife."

Esther Burr's daughter, Sarah, married Tapping Reeve, the founder of America's first law school Litchfield Law School and previously Aaron Jr. and Sarah's school tutor. Esther's son, Aaron, became the third vice president of the United States (1801–05) and is best known for fatally wounding American politician Alexander Hamilton in a duel in 1804.

== Journal ==
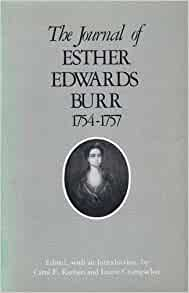
The Journal of Esther Edwards Burr, 1754-1757 edited by Carol F. Karlsen and Laurie Crumpacker.

Like the earlier journal of Sarah Kemble Knight in 1704–1705, Burr's Journal provides insight into a woman's daily life in the late colonial period of the United States. Burr's Journal might be called an epistolary diary since, rather than being a traditional diary written as a private record for oneself, her Journal consists of daily letters exchanged with her childhood friend Sarah Prince in Boston from 1754 to 1757. In the Journal, Sarah Prince is referred to as Fidelia while Sarah refers to Esther as Burrissa, most likely a reference to her last name after she married Aaron Burr Sr. Burr wrote about ordinary things that happened around her, but she also sometimes expressed original thoughts in passing about serious topics, such as the dominant themes of loneliness and hardship of everyday existence as well as slavery.

There exist multiple editions of Burr's Journal that can be somewhat confusing. In 1901, the president of Howard University, Jeremiah Rankin, published a book which, despite being entitled Esther Burr's Journal is actually a fictionalized account of Esther's life. It was not until 1984 that Esther Burr's Journal was published in its entirety by Carol F. Karlsen and Laurie Crumpacker, but this book is no longer in print and it is quite hard to find a copy in good condition.

== Death ==
In September 1757, Aaron Burr Sr. died of a fever in Princeton. Esther's father, Jonathan Edwards, came to Princeton to be Burr's successor as president of the college, but died on March 22, 1758, from complications following a smallpox inoculation. Barely a fortnight after the sudden death of her father, Esther also fell ill and died on April 7, 1758, after "a few days illness." She was seized with a fever, apparently not linked to her recent smallpox inoculation, which produced a violent headache and then delirium. Her sister Sarah believed it was not unlike the sudden fever from which her sister Jerusha had died. Esther's death left her two children, Aaron and Sarah Burr, as orphans. Aaron and his sister went to live with their wealthy maternal uncle Timothy Edwards in a cramped, crowded environment. Sarah Edwards, Esther's mother, died soon after in October 1758. Esther, along with the rest of the Edwards family, were buried together at the Bridge Street Cemetery in Northampton.

Sarah Prince was nearly inconsolable by Esther's death. In her personal book of meditations, she wrote, "My whole dependance for Comfort in this World [is] gone...", and "[Esther] was dear to me as the Apple of my Eye - she knew and felt all my griefs..."

== In popular culture ==
=== Theatre and film ===
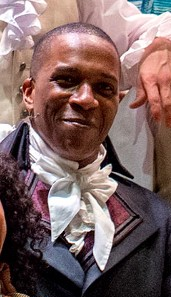
Leslie Odom Jr. as Esther's son Aaron Burr in Hamilton.

Esther Edward Burr's son, Aaron Burr Jr., is a feature character in the hit Broadway musical "Hamilton." Leslie Odom Jr. originated the role. Aaron mentions his mother twice in the first half of the musical. Esther is personified by a female ensemble member during the song "Wait For It" when Aaron sings the lines "My mother was a genius" and "when they died they left no instructions, just a legacy to protect." Esther is also briefly mentioned in the song "Aaron Burr, Sir", when Aaron says it was his parents' dying wish for him to attend Princeton University.
