= Aaron Burr Sr. =

Father of Aaron Burr and President of Princeton University (1716–1757)

The Reverend Aaron Burr Sr.
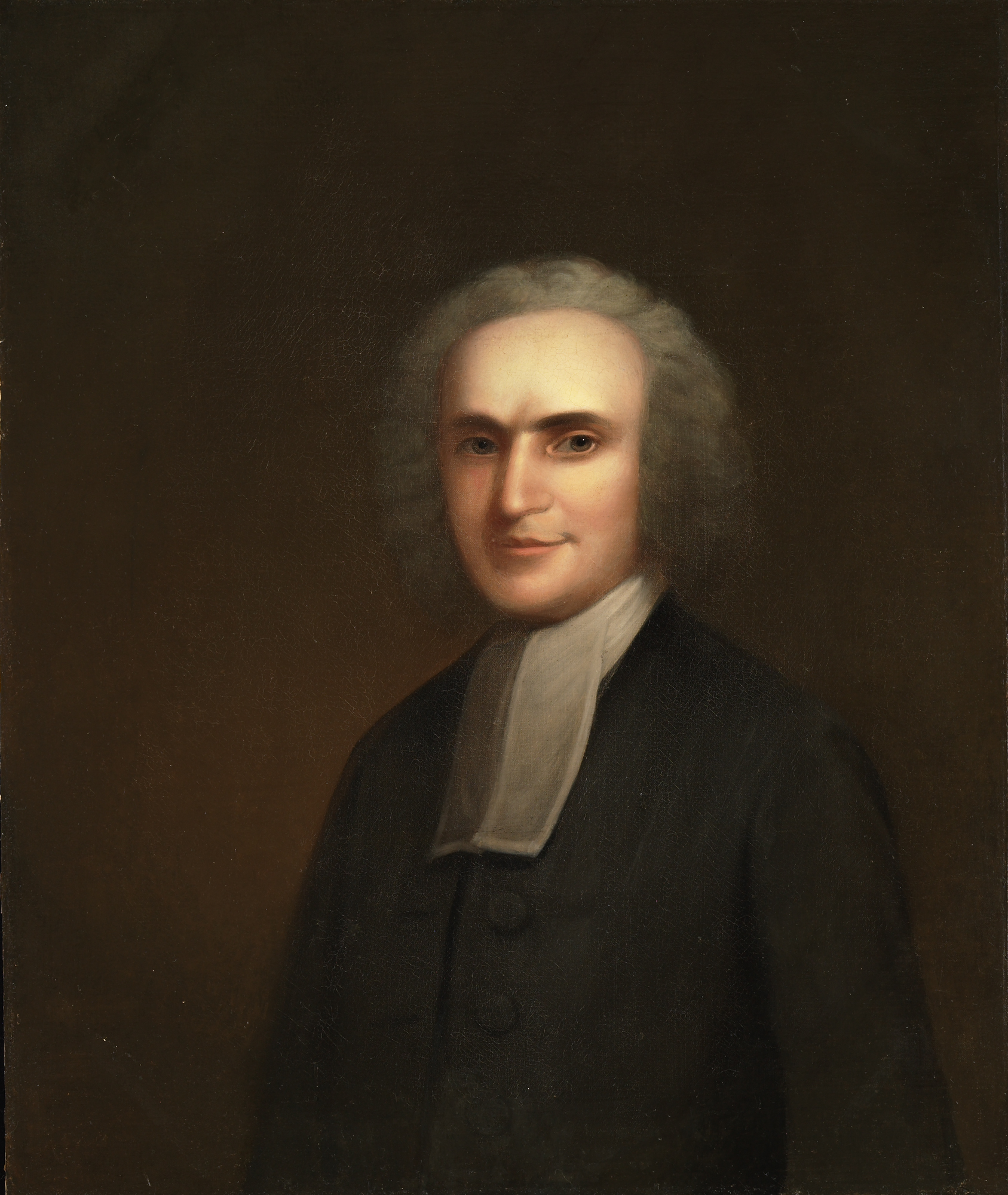
- Edward Ludlow Mooney, Aaron Burr Sr. (1716–1801), President (1748–57), Princeton University Art Museum

2nd President of Princeton University
- In office 1748–1757
- Preceded by: Jonathan Dickinson
- Succeeded by: Jonathan Edwards

Personal details
- Born: January 4, 1716 Fairfield, Connecticut Colony
- Died: September 24, 1757 (aged 41) Princeton, Province of New Jersey
- Spouse: Esther Edwards (m. 1752)
- Children: Sarah Burr; Aaron Burr Jr.
- Parent(s): Daniel and Elizabeth Burr

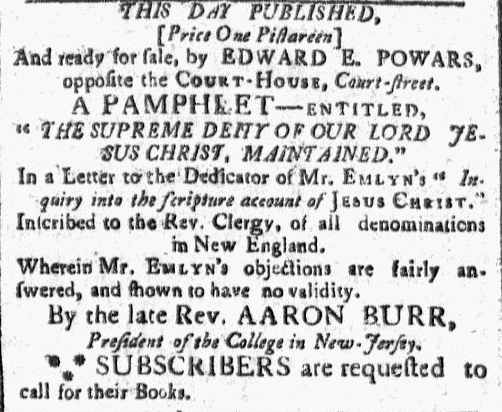
Publication notice of a pamphlet "The Supreme Deity of our Lord Jesus Christ, Maintained" by Burr (Boston: Edward Eveleth Powars, 1791)

Aaron Burr Sr. (January 4, 1716 – September 24, 1757) was a Presbyterian minister and college educator in colonial America. He was a founder of the College of New Jersey (now Princeton University) and the father of Aaron Burr (1756–1836), the third vice president of the United States.

== Early years ==
A native of Connecticut, Burr was born in 1716 in present-day Fairfield to Daniel Burr (1660–1727) and Elizabeth Burr, nee Pinckney (1673–1722), daughter of captain Philip Pinckney (1618–1689). His father was a wealthy farmer. He was of English ancestry (his paternal grandfather Jehu Burr (1625–1692) had been born in Lavenham, Suffolk, England, settled in the Connecticut Colony as a young man, and died there).

Aaron Burr attended Yale College (now Yale University), where he obtained a B.A. in 1735. After graduation, he studied theology in New Haven and witnessed the First Great Awakening, a significant religious and spiritual movement of the 1730s and 1740s. He was personally acquainted with Jonathan Edwards and his wife Sarah, daughter of James Pierpont, who is credited with founding Yale. Edwards, a leader of the Great Awakening, was Burr's mentor and would later become his father-in-law.

== Career ==
On December 21, 1756, Burr became a minister of the Presbyterian Church of Newark, Newark, New Jersey. He also taught Greek and Latin to youth, and co-authored Introduction to the Latin Tongue. After a few years, Burr rose to prominence in the Presbyterian circles of upper New Jersey and the New York City area.

=== College founder ===
Between 1741 and 1758, a controversy over unorthodox piety fostered by the Great Awakening and how it affected traditional authority of church officers led to internal differences in the Presbyterian and Congregational churches. Presbyterians became divided between the so-called conservative Old Side and dissenting, pro-Awakening New Side congregationalists—between Old and New Lights. The rift affected the faculty and student body at Yale that was at the time an incubator for both Presbyterian and Congregational clergy. In opposition to Thomas Clap, Yale's first president, Jonathan Edwards, Burr, and Jonathan Dickinson, all being on the pro-Awakening side, founded the College of New Jersey (now Princeton University) at Elizabeth, New Jersey, in 1746.

Dickinson was elected first president of the College, but died soon after in 1747. Burr, who taught at the College, then became the second president on November 9, 1748 after approval of the college charter by the New Jersey governor, Jonathan Belcher. During his tenure (1748–1757), the curriculum was settled, the student body increased from 8 in 1747 to 40–50 in 1751, and the first commencement was held. Among the first graduates was Richard Stockton, a signer of the Declaration of Independence; five others became Presbyterian ministers. Burr moved the College to its permanent home at Princeton, New Jersey, where he supervised the construction of Nassau Hall, Princeton's best-known structure and the largest building in colonial New Jersey when it was completed in 1756. In 1755, Burr was relieved of his pastoral duties in order to concentrate full-time on his work at Princeton. At age 32, he became the youngest person ever to serve as president of Princeton.

In September 1756, when the French and Indian War was underway, Burr wrote a sermon in which he sought to defend the "Priviledges [sic] of unadulterated Christianity; British Liberty and Property, in a delightful and fruitful Country" foretelling future fusion of secular and religious rhetoric in the Revolutionary era.

== Personal life ==
On June 29, 1752, Burr married Jonathan and Sarah Edwards' daughter Esther (1732–1758). Together, they had two children:

- Sarah "Sally" Burr (1754–1797), who married Tapping Reeve (1744–1823)
- Aaron Burr Jr. (1756–1836), who in 1782 married Theodosia Bartow Prevost (1746–1794), widow of an officer of the British army, Jacques Marcus Prevost (1736–1781), who was a younger brother of general Augustine Prevost (1723–1786). After her death in 1794, he married Eliza Jumel (1775–1865) in 1833.

=== Death ===
In the fall of 1757, Burr died in his first year in Princeton (tenth year of being the president) of fever after traveling to Massachusetts to Governor Belcher's funeral where he delivered a sermon. It was believed that his premature death had been brought on or aggravated by overwork. His remains were interred in the President's Lot at Princeton Cemetery. His widow died seven months later, orphaning their three-year-old daughter and two-year-old son.

=== Descendants ===
His grandchildren include Aaron Burr Reeve (1780–1809), who died shortly after the birth of his only child, Tapping Burr Reeve (1809–1829), and Theodosia Burr (1783–1813). Theodosia was married to Joseph Alston (1779–1816), who served as the 44th governor of South Carolina from 1812 to 1814.

== Brothers and sisters ==
Aaron Burr Sr. had many siblings from his father's three marriages:

- Hannah Burr (b. 1681)
- Jehu Burr (1687–1757), was twice married, among his sons was Jehu Burr Jr. (1734–1808).
- Mary Burr (1689–1763), married David Meeker (1687–1754).
- Elizabeth Burr (1696–1760), married Nathaniel Hull (1695–1749).
- Stephen Burr (1697–1778)
- Peter Burr (1699–1777)
- Jane Burr (1701–1779), married Samuel Sherwood (1699–1768).
- Esther Burr (1703–1741), married Daniel Bradley (1704–1765).
- David Burr (1709–1766)
- Moses Burr (1714–1740)

== Works ==
- Burr, Aaron. Sermon at the Ordination of David Bostwick. New York, 1745.
- Burr, Aaron. A Discourse Delivered at New-Ark in New Jersey, January 1, 1755. New York, 1755.
- Burr, Aaron. The Watchman's Answer to the Question, What of the Night, & C: A Sermon Preached Before the Synod of New York, Convened at Newark in New Jersey, September 30, 1756. Boston, 1757.
- Burr, Aaron. The Supreme Deity of our Lord Jesus Christ, Maintained. Boston, 1757.
- Burr, Aaron. A Funeral Sermon, Preached at the Interment of Jonathan Belcher, Esg. New York, 1757.

Academic offices
Preceded by Jonathan Dickinson	President of the College of New Jersey; 1747–1757	Succeeded by Jonathan Edwards
