= Aaron Burr's farewell address =

1805 speech to U.S. Senate

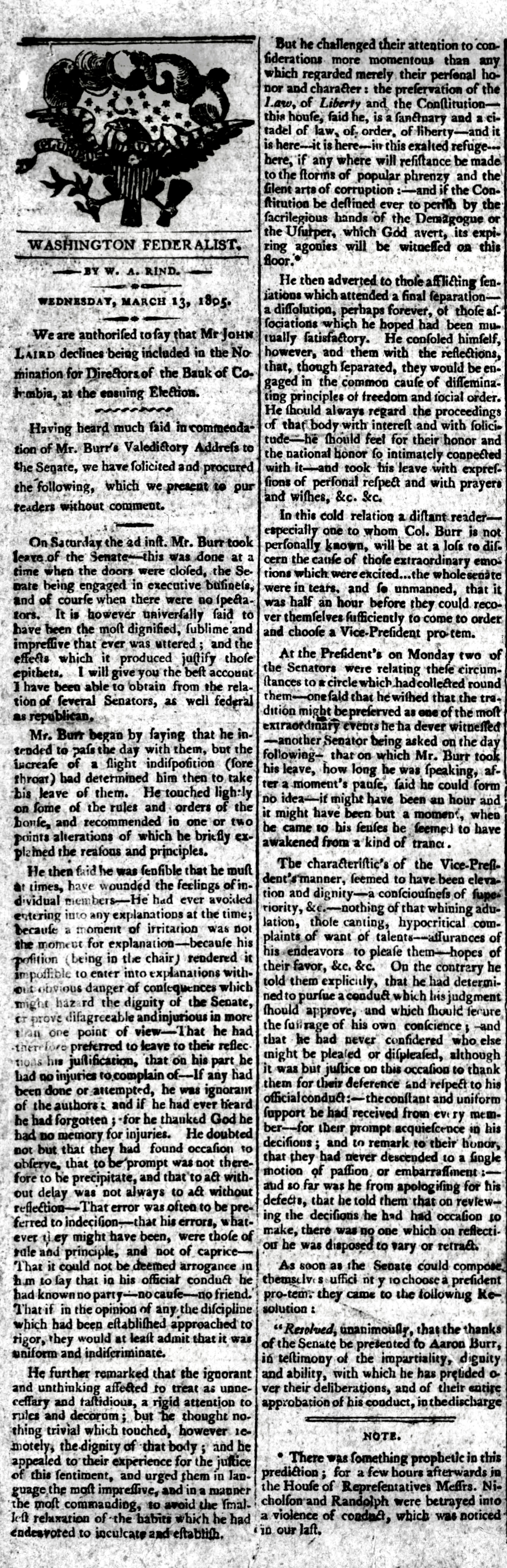
"Mr. Burr's Valedictory Address" Washington Federalist, District of Columbia, March 13, 1805

Aaron Burr's March 1805 farewell address to the United States Senate is remembered as one of the preeminent speeches of the American Vice Presidency. Burr spoke for 20 or 30 minutes, and upon concluding, departed the chamber solemnly, the sound of the closing door resounding through the room upon his exit. The speech left U.S. Senators in tears. At least one fragment of the address has been preserved:

This house is a sanctuary; a citadel of law, of order, and of liberty; and it is here—it is here, in this exalted refuge; here, if anywhere, will resistance be made to the storms of political phrenzy and the silent arts of corruption; and if the Constitution be destined ever to perish by the sacrilegious hands of the demagogue or the usurper, which God avert, its expiring agonies will be witnessed on this floor.
