= Edward Ludlow Mooney =

American painter (1813–1887)

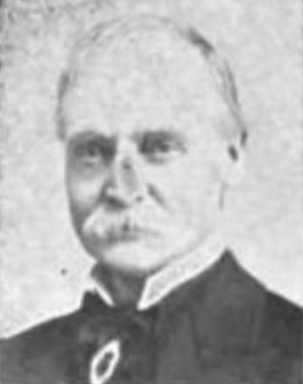
- Born: March 25, 1813; New York, New York
- Died: July 10, 1887 (aged 74); New York, New York
- Occupation: Painter

Edward Ludlow Mooney (March 25, 1813 – July 10, 1887) was an American painter.

== Biography ==
Edward Ludlow Mooney was born in New York City on March 25, 1813.

He was trained by Henry Inman and William Page, and was known for his portraits of famous politicians and officials.

He died in New York on July 10, 1887.

== Selected works ==
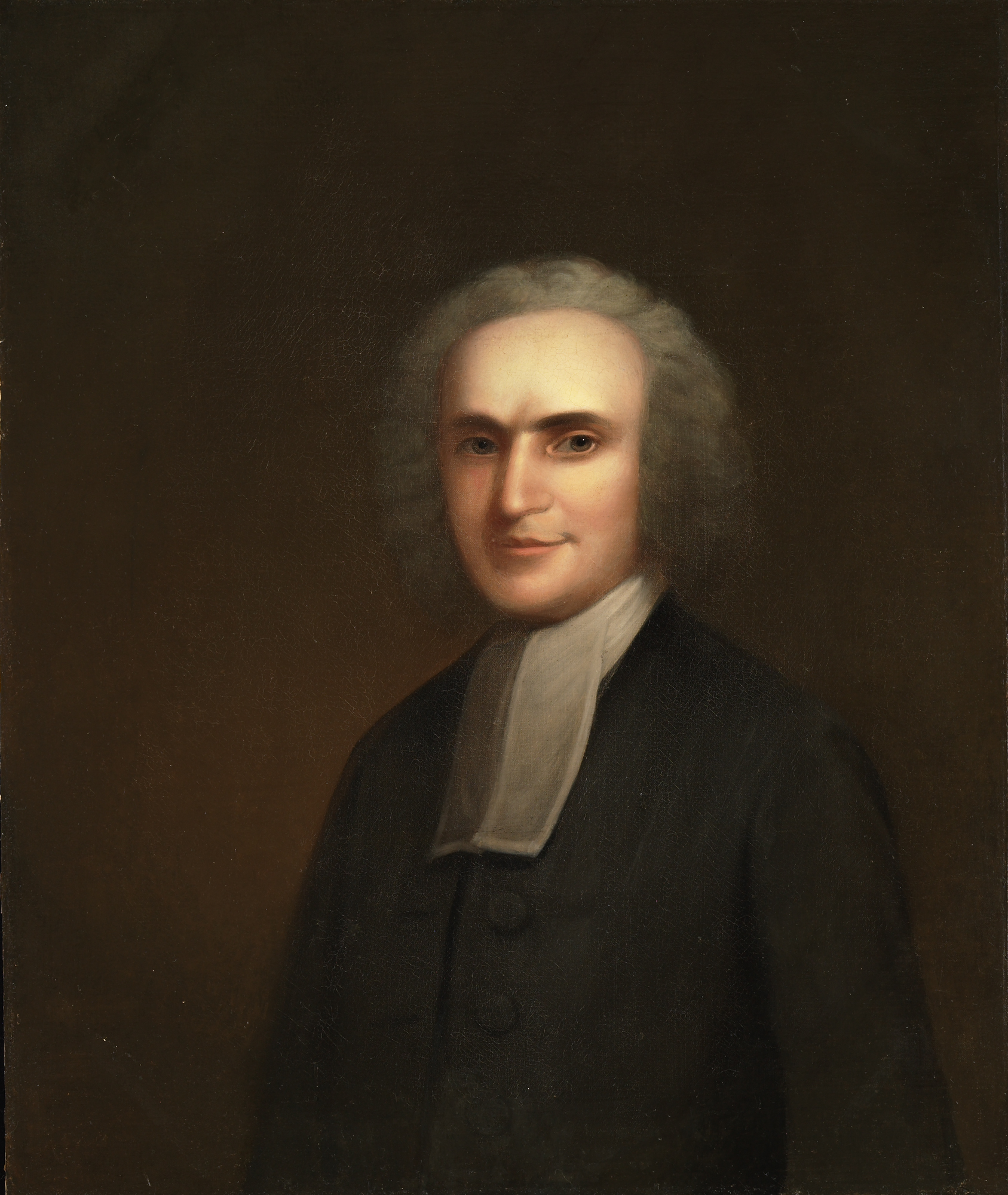
Portrait of Aaron Burr Sr., Princeton University Art Museum

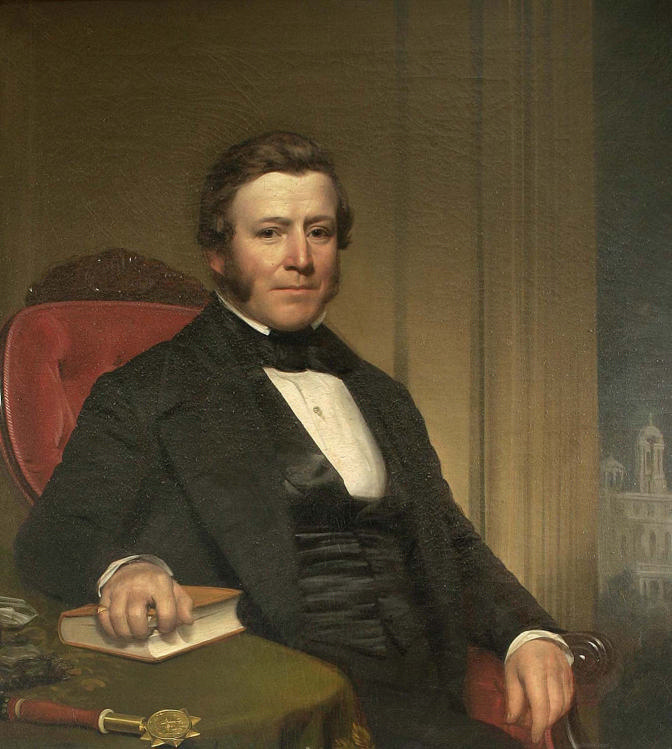
Portrait of Andrew H. Mickle (1847), New York City Hall Portrait Collection

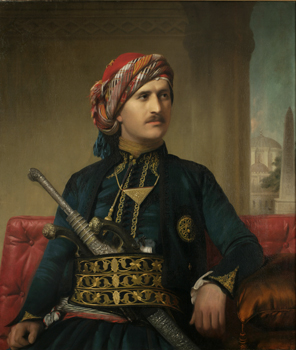
Armenian in Old Style of Turkish Costume (1848–49), National Academy of Design

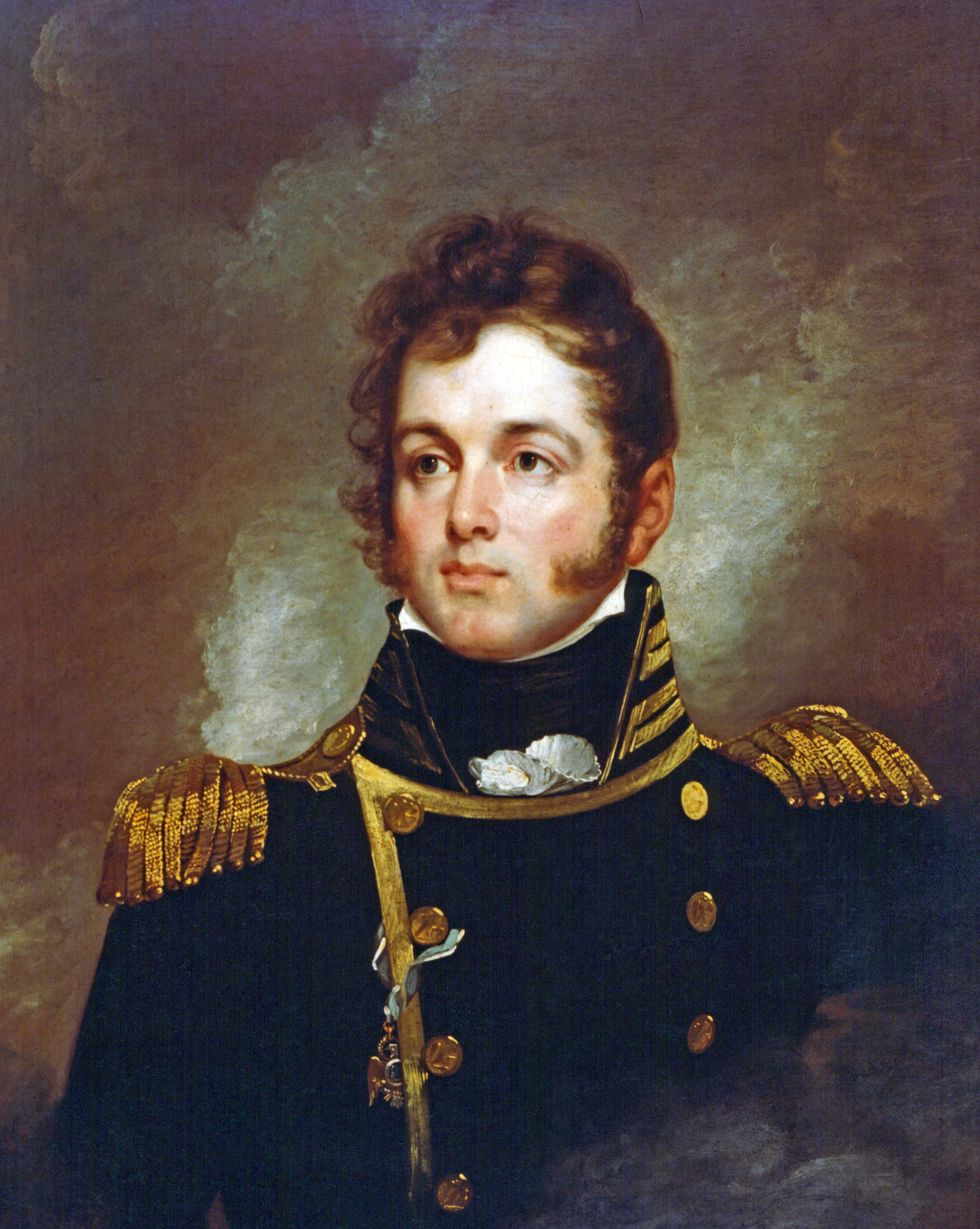
Portrait of Captain Oliver Hazard Perry (1839), U.S. Naval Academy Museum

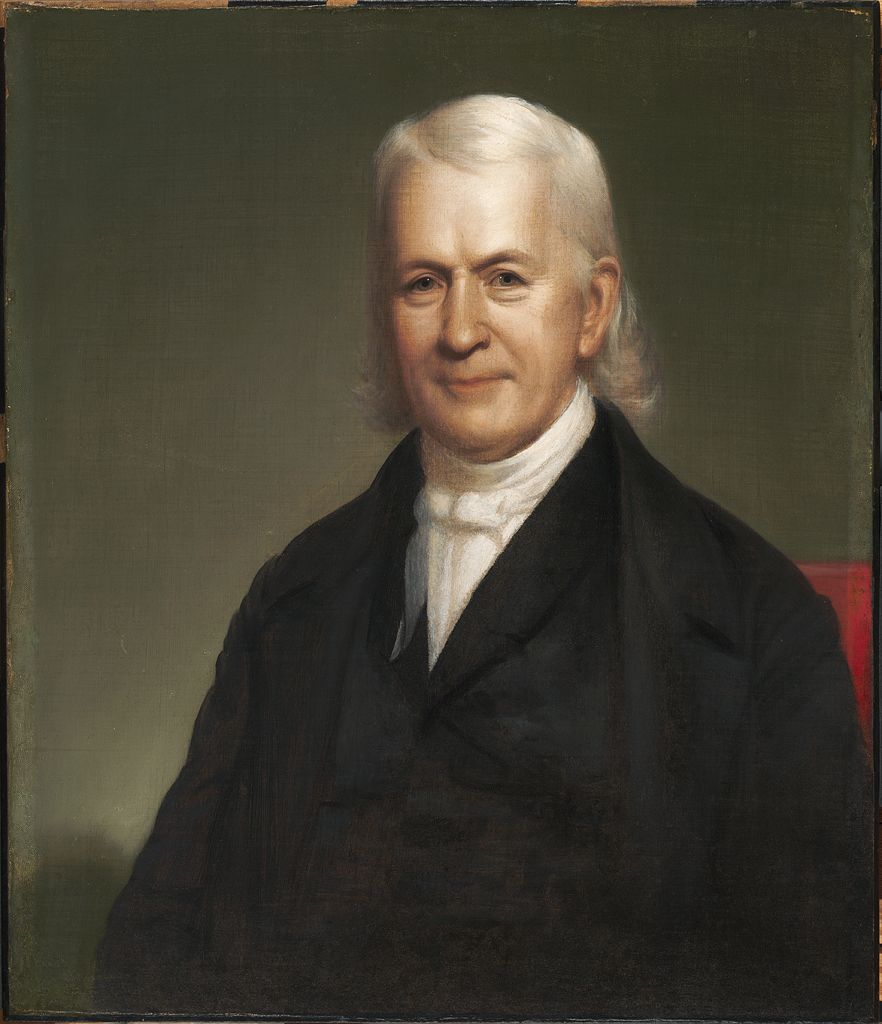
Portrait of John Davis Pierce (1846), Harvard Art Museums
