= James Pierpont (minister) =

American Congregationalist minister and co-founder of Yale University (1659-1714)

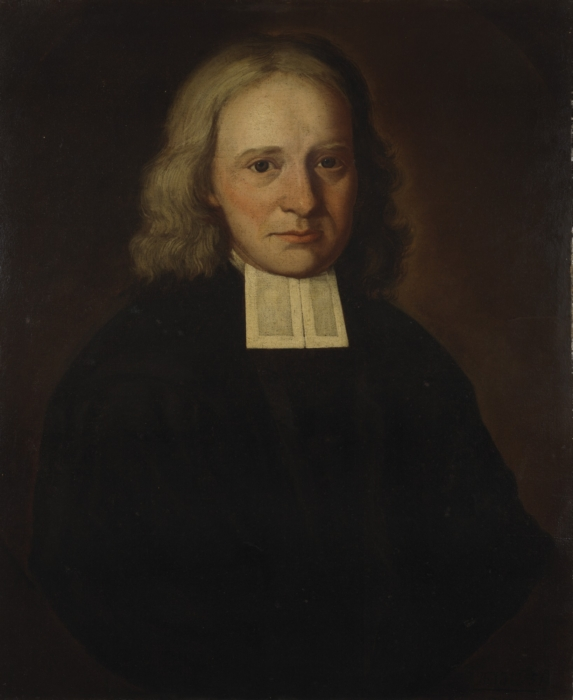
- Rev. James Pierpont, 1711
- Born: January 1, 1659; Roxbury, Massachusetts
- Died: November 22, 1714 (aged 55); New Haven, Connecticut
- Education: Harvard College
- Occupation: Minister
- Known for: Founder of Yale College
- Spouses: Abigail Davenport (m. 1691; died 1692); Sarah Haynes (m. 1694; died 1696); Mary Hooker (m. 1698)

James Pierpont or Pierrepont (January 4, 1659 – November 22, 1714) was a Congregationalist minister who is credited with the founding of Yale University in the United States.

== Early life ==
Pierpont was born in Roxbury, Massachusetts, on January 4, 1659. He was one of five children born to John Pierpont and his wife, Thankful (née Stow) Pierpont (1629–1664), daughter of John Stow. His father, who was born in London in 1619, was a Roxbury town officer and a deputy to the general court before his death in 1682.

He attended The Roxbury Latin School and Harvard College.

== Career ==
Pierpont became an ordained Congregationalist minister on July 2, 1685. In 1701, he secured the charter for The Collegiate School of Connecticut, which soon thereafter took the surname of its chief benefactor, Elihu Yale. He served as a founding trustee of Yale from October 16, 1701, until his death in 1714.

== Personal life ==
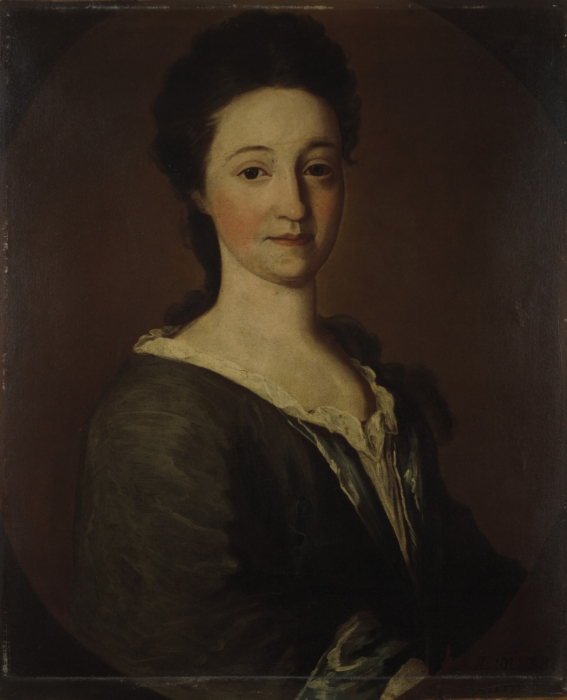
Mary Hooker Pierpont, the third wife of Rev. James Pierpont

Pierpont was married three times and lived in New Haven at what was known as the Pierpont Mansion. His first marriage was on October 27, 1691, to Abigail Davenport (1672–1691), the daughter of John Davenport and Abigail (née Pierson) Davenport. Abigail died on February 3, 1692, from a cold she caught shortly after their marriage. His second wife was Sarah Haynes (1673–1696), whom he married on May 30, 1694. Sarah was the daughter of Rev. Joseph Haynes and Sarah (née Lord) Haynes, and the granddaughter of Governor John Haynes. She died on October 27, 1696, after giving birth to their only child:

- Abigail Pierpont (1696–1768), who married Rev. Joseph Noyes (1688–1761) in 1716.

In 1698, James Pierpont married for the third time to Mary Hooker (1673–1740) of Farmington. Mary was a daughter of Rev. Samuel Hooker and granddaughter of Rev. Thomas Hooker, chief founder of the Colony of Connecticut.

- James Pierpoint (1699–1776), who married Sarah Breck (1710–1753). After her death, he married Anne Sherman (1728–1803) in 1754.
- Samuel Pierpoint (1700–1723), who drowned while crossing the Connecticut River in a canoe.
- Mary Pierpont (1702–1740), who married Rev. William Russell (1690–1761) in 1719.
- Joseph Pierpont (1704–1748), who married Hannah Russell. After his death, Hannah married Samuel Sackett.
- Benjamin Pierpont (1706–1706), who died in infancy.
- Benjamin Pierpont (1707–1733), who died unmarried.
- Sarah Pierpont (1710–1758), who married noted colonial minister Jonathan Edwards (1703–1758) in 1727.
- Hezekiah Pierpont (1712–1741), who married Lydia Hemingway (1716–1779). After his death, Lydia married Theophilus Morgan.

He died on November 22, 1714, in New Haven, Connecticut, where he was buried. His widow died on November 1, 1740.

=== Descendants ===
Pierpont's descendants also include U.S. Vice President Aaron Burr, financier John Pierpont (J.P.) Morgan, Edwards Pierrepont, and songwriter James Lord Pierpont, best known for "Jingle Bells".
