= Aaron Burr =

Vice President of the United States from 1801 to 1805

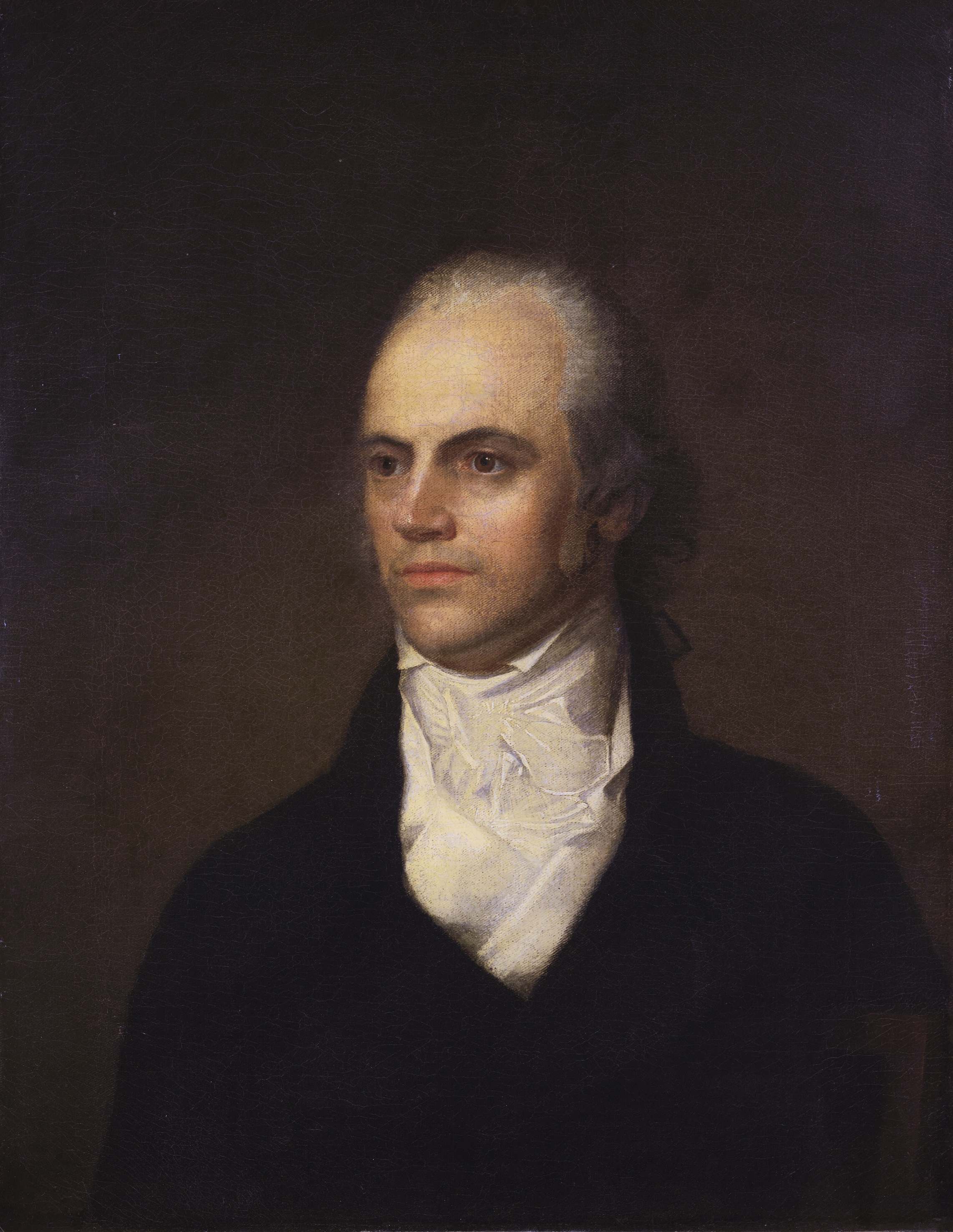
- Portrait by John Vanderlyn, c. 1803

3rd Vice President of the United States
- In office March 4, 1801 – March 4, 1805
- President: Thomas Jefferson
- Preceded by: Thomas Jefferson
- Succeeded by: George Clinton

United States Senator from New York
- In office March 4, 1791 – March 3, 1797
- Preceded by: Philip Schuyler
- Succeeded by: Philip Schuyler

3rd Attorney General of New York
- In office September 29, 1789 – November 8, 1791
- Governor: George Clinton
- Preceded by: Richard Varick
- Succeeded by: Morgan Lewis

Member of the New York State Assembly from New York County
- In office July 1, 1797 – June 30, 1799
- In office July 1, 1784 – June 30, 1785

Personal details
- Born: Aaron Burr Jr. February 6, 1756 Newark, Province of New Jersey, British America
- Died: September 14, 1836 (aged 80) Port Richmond, Staten Island (now-New York City)
- Resting place: Princeton Cemetery
- Party: Democratic-Republican
- Spouses: Theodosia Bartow Prevost (m. 1782; died 1794); Eliza Jumel (m. 1833; div. 1836)
- Children: 10 or more, including Theodosia, John, and Aaron
- Parents: Aaron Burr Sr.; Esther Edwards
- Relatives: Sarah Burr Reeve (sister); Theodore Burr (cousin)
- Education: Princeton University (AB)

Military service
- Allegiance: United States
- Branch/service: Continental Army
- Years of service: 1775–1779
- Rank: Lieutenant colonel
- Battles/wars: American Revolutionary War; Battle of Quebec; Battle of Monmouth

Aaron Burr Jr. (February 6, 1756 – September 14, 1836) was an American politician, businessman and lawyer who served as the third vice president of the United States from 1801 to 1805, during Thomas Jefferson's first presidential term. A member of the Democratic-Republican Party, he is primarily remembered for the killing of Founding Father Alexander Hamilton in a duel, as well as his alleged conspiracy to take parts of the United States or the Spanish Empire to form an independent country.

Burr was born to a prominent family in what was then the Province of New Jersey. After studying theology at the College of New Jersey (now Princeton University), he began his career as a lawyer before joining the Continental Army as an officer in the American Revolutionary War in 1775. After leaving military service in 1779, Burr practiced law in New York City, where he became a leading politician and helped form the new Jeffersonian Democratic-Republican Party.

In 1791, Burr was elected to the United States Senate, where he served until 1797. He later ran in the 1800 presidential election. An Electoral College tie between Burr and Jefferson resulted in the U.S. House of Representatives voting in Jefferson's favor, with Burr becoming Jefferson's vice president due to receiving the second-highest share of the votes. Although Burr maintained that he supported Jefferson, the president was somewhat at odds with Burr, who was relegated to the sidelines of the administration during his vice presidency and was not selected as Jefferson's running mate in 1804 after the ratification of the Twelfth Amendment to the U.S. Constitution.

Burr traveled west to the American frontier, seeking new economic and political opportunities. His secretive activities led to his 1807 arrest in Alabama on charges of treason. Burr was brought to trial more than once for what became known as the Burr conspiracy, an alleged plot to create an independent country led by Burr, but was acquitted each time. For a short period of time, Burr left the U.S. to live in Europe. He returned in 1812 and resumed practicing law in New York City. He died of a stroke on September 14, 1836, at the age of 80.

== Early life and education ==
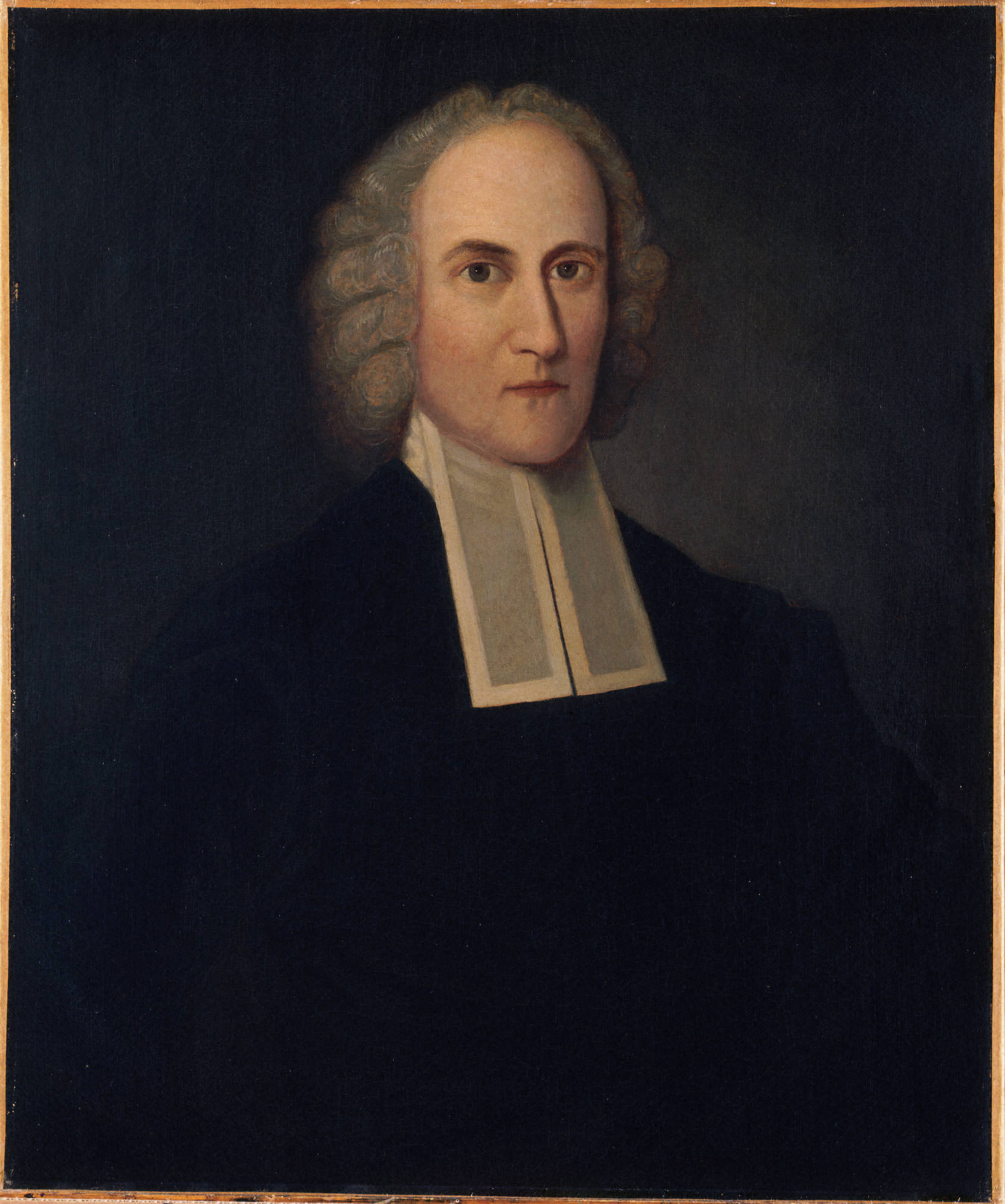
Burr's maternal grandfather Jonathan Edwards, a Congregationalist theologian

Aaron Burr Jr. was born on February 6, 1756, in Newark, in what was then the Province of New Jersey, one of the Thirteen Colonies of colonial-era British America. He was the second child of the Reverend Aaron Burr Sr., a Presbyterian minister and co-founder of the College of New Jersey (now Princeton University) of which he served as the school's second president after his election in 1748. Burr's mother, Esther Edwards Burr, was the daughter of Jonathan Edwards, a philosopher-theologian, and his wife Sarah Edwards, a missionary. He had one older sister, Sarah, who was also known as Sally.

On September 24, 1757, Burr's father died after experiencing exhaustion and a high fever in the weeks prior to his death. Jonathan Edwards, Burr's maternal grandfather, briefly became the third president of the university for two months, having succumbed to a high fever related to a smallpox inoculation on March 22, 1758. Sixteen days later, on April 7, Burr's mother died from a fever. While traveling with their maternal grandmother Sarah to what was to be their new home in Philadelphia, Sarah died on October 2 from dysentery. Burr and his sister Sally were orphaned at the age of two years old and three years old respectively.

Young Burr and his sister were placed with the William Shippen family in Philadelphia, then the capital of British America. The following year, in 1759, the children's guardianship was assumed by their 21-year-old maternal uncle, Timothy Edwards. The following year, Edwards married Rhoda Ogden, and moved the family to Elizabeth, New Jersey, where Burr attended the Elizabethtown Academy. Burr had a very strained relationship with his uncle, who was often physically abusive. As a child, he made several attempts to run away from home.

At age 13, Burr was admitted to the College of New Jersey as a sophomore, where he joined the American Whig Society and the Cliosophic Society, the college's literary and debating societies. In 1772, at age 16, he received his Bachelor of Arts degree, but continued studying theology at Princeton for an additional year. He then undertook rigorous theological training with Joseph Bellamy, a Presbyterian, but changed his career path after two years. At age 19, he moved to Litchfield, Connecticut, to study law with his brother-in-law Tapping Reeve, founder of the Litchfield Law School and husband of his sister Sally. In 1775, news reached Litchfield of the clashes with British troops in the Battles of Lexington and Concord, which launched the American Revolutionary War, and Burr put his studies on hold to enlist in the Continental Army.

== Career ==
=== Revolutionary War ===
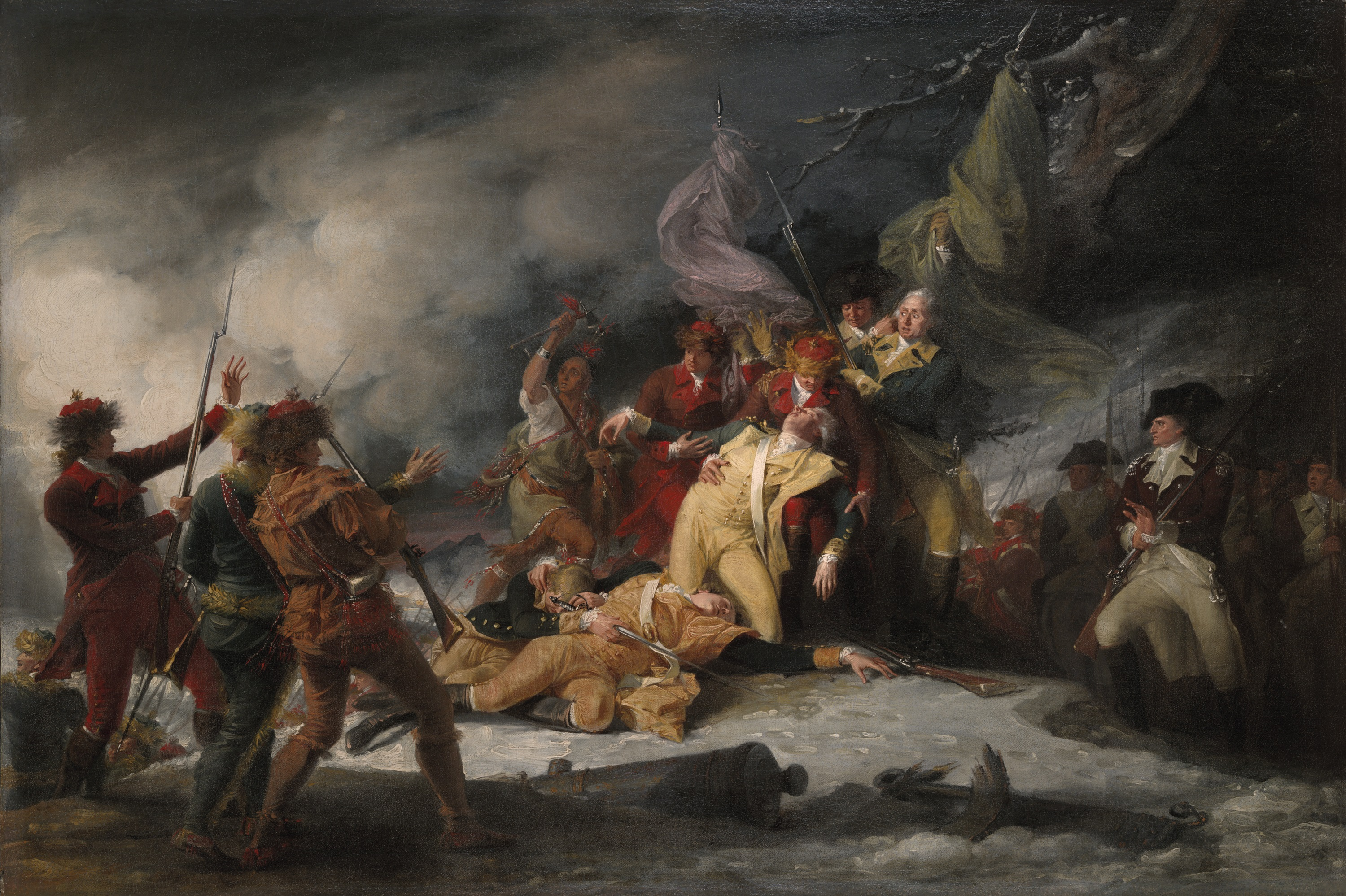
The Death of General Montgomery in the Attack on Quebec, December 31, 1775, a 1786 portrait by John Trumbull depicting the Battle of Quebec in 1775

During the Revolutionary War, Burr took part in Colonel Benedict Arnold's expedition to Quebec, an arduous trek of more than 300 miles (480 km) through the northern frontier of the Province of Massachusetts Bay (now Maine). Arnold was impressed by Burr's "great spirit and resolution" during the long march. He sent him up the Saint Lawrence River to contact General Richard Montgomery, who had taken Montreal, and escort him to Quebec. Montgomery then promoted Burr to captain and made him an aide-de-camp. Burr distinguished himself during the Battle of Quebec on December 31, 1775, where he attempted to recover Montgomery's corpse after he had been killed. However, his attempts to rescue the body of his general were short-lived, as Burr gave up due to the harsh conditions of the snow and the dead weight of Montgomery's body.

In the spring of 1776, Burr's relative Matthias Ogden helped him to secure a position with George Washington's staff in New York City, but he quit on June 26 to be on the battlefield. After John Hancock recommended Burr, General Israel Putnam took him under his wing, and Burr saved an entire brigade from capture after the British landing in Manhattan by his vigilance in the retreat from Lower Manhattan to Harlem. Washington did not recognize his actions in the following day's General Orders, through which promotions could be obtained most quickly. Burr was already a nationally known hero, but he never received a commendation. According to Ogden, Burr was infuriated by the incident, which may have led to the eventual estrangement between him and Washington. Nevertheless, he defended Washington's decision to evacuate New York as "a necessary consequence". It was not until the 1790s that the two men found themselves on opposite sides in politics.

Burr was briefly posted in Kingsbridge during 1776, at which time he was charged with protecting fourteen-year-old Margaret Moncrieffe, the daughter of Staten Island-based British Major Thomas Moncrieffe. Miss Moncrieffe was in Manhattan "behind enemy lines", and Major Moncrieffe asked Washington to ensure her safe return there. Margaret fell in love with Burr, but her attempts to remain with him were unsuccessful.

In late 1776, Burr attempted to secure Washington's approval to retake fortifications on Staten Island, which were then held by the British, citing his deep familiarity with the area. Washington said he wanted to defer such an action until later in the conflict, and ultimately chose not to pursue it. The British learned of Burr's plans and later took extra precautions.

In July 1777, Burr was promoted to lieutenant colonel and assumed virtual leadership of Malcolm's Additional Continental Regiment. There were approximately 300 men under Colonel William Malcolm's nominal command, but Malcolm was frequently called upon to perform other duties, leaving Burr in charge. The regiment successfully fought off many nighttime raids into central New Jersey by Manhattan-based British troops who arrived by water. Later that year, Burr commanded a small contingent during the harsh winter encampment at Valley Forge, guarding "the Gulph", an isolated pass that controlled one approach to the camp. He imposed discipline and defeated an attempted mutiny by some of the troops. Some of the men, upset with Burr's method of leadership, plotted to kill him. Being informed of the plot, Burr made sure his men's guns were emptied. At night, one man fired his empty musket at Burr, and the latter immediately drew his sword, severing his attacker's arm. There were no more mutinies at the Gulph from that point on.

Burr's regiment was devastated by British artillery on June 28, 1778, at the Battle of Monmouth, and Burr suffered heatstroke and exhaustion. Washington denied his request for medical leave without pay, and instead placed Burr in temporary command of the garrison at West Point, New York, until his recovery.

In January 1779, Burr was assigned to Westchester County, a region between the British post at Kingsbridge and that of the Americans about 15 miles (24 km) to the north. This district was part of the more significant command of General Alexander McDougall, and there was much turbulence and plundering by lawless bands of civilians and by raiding parties of ill-disciplined soldiers from both armies.

Due to continuing poor health, Burr resigned from the Continental Army in March 1779. During his recovery, Burr carried urgent messages to Washington and various officers at the request of Generals McDougall and Arthur St. Clair. On July 5, 1779, he rallied a group of Yale students at New Haven, Connecticut, along with Captain James Hillhouse and the Second Connecticut Governor's Guards, in a skirmish with the British at the West River. The British advance was repulsed, forcing them to enter New Haven from nearby Hamden.

In 1783, Burr became an Original Member of the New York Society of the Cincinnati, an organization of officers who had served in the Continental Army and Navy during the Revolution.

=== Marriage to Theodosia Bartow Prevost ===
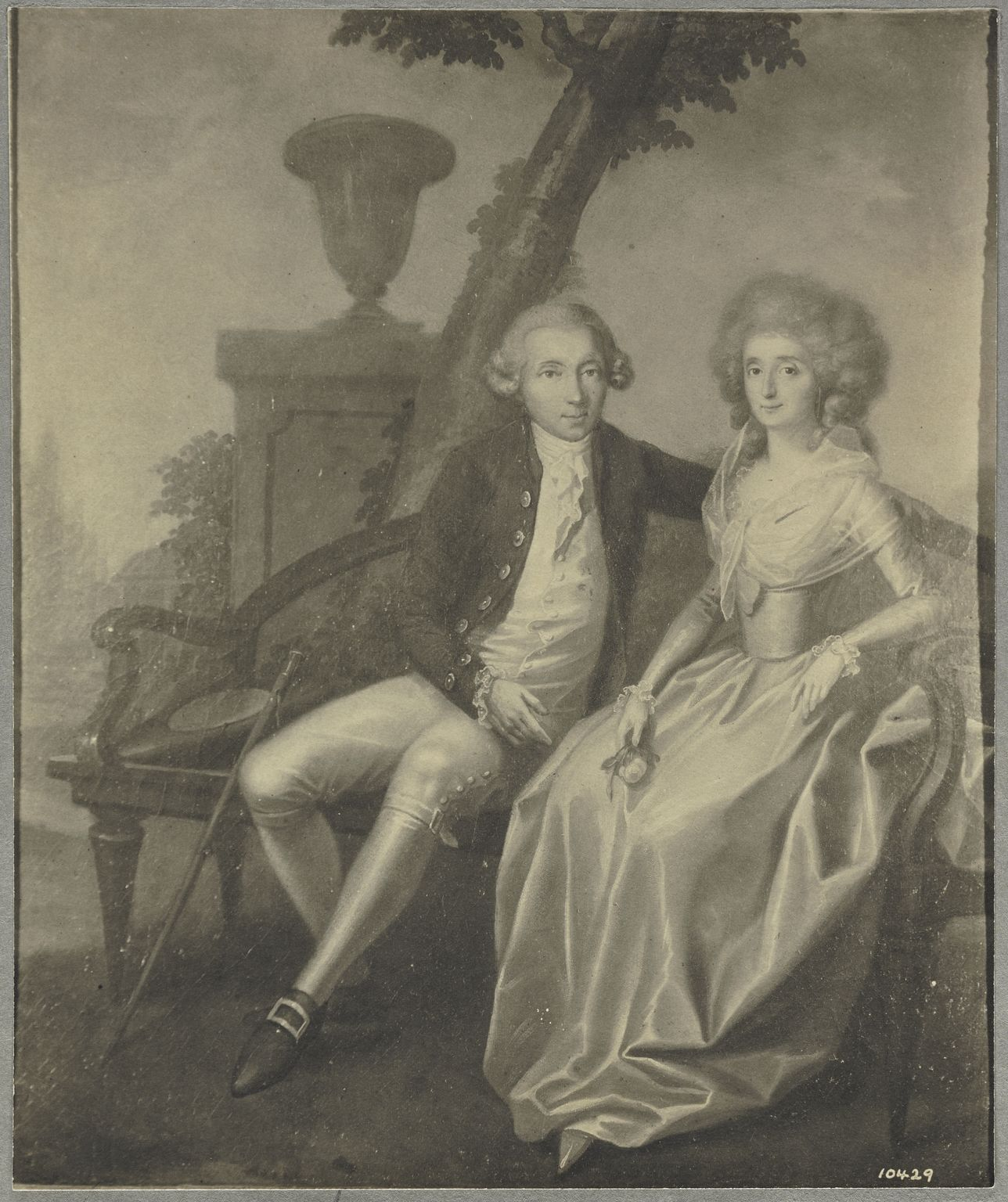
A portrait of Burr and Theodosia Bartow Prevost, who Burr married in 1782, by Henry Benbridge

Burr met Theodosia Bartow Prevost in August 1778 while she was married to Jacques Marcus Prevost, a Swiss-born British officer in the Royal American Regiment. In Prevost's absence, Burr began regularly visiting Theodosia at The Hermitage, her home in New Jersey. Theodosia would go on to visit Burr many times throughout his stay at West Point in June through July of 1778. Although she was ten years Burr's senior, the constant visits provoked gossip, and by 1780 the two were openly lovers. In December 1781, Burr learned that Prevost had died of yellow fever while serving in Jamaica.

After her husband's death, Theodosia was hesitant to marry Burr right away, writing to him: "When I am sensible I can make you and myself happy, I will readily join you... But till I am confident of this, I cannot think of our union." After a few months of consideration, however, Burr and Theodosia were married on July 2, 1782, and they moved to a house on Wall Street in Lower Manhattan. After several years of severe illness, Theodosia died in 1794 from stomach or uterine cancer. Their only child to survive to adulthood was Theodosia Burr Alston, born in 1783.

=== Law and politics ===
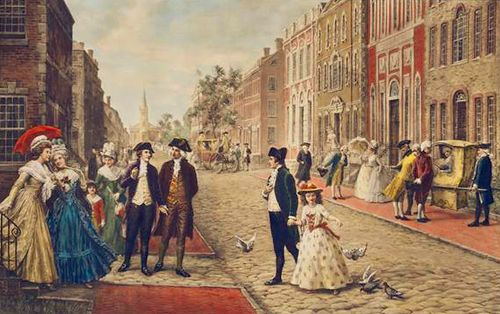
A 1913 illustration of Alexander Hamilton, Philip Schuyler, and Burr with daughter Theodosia strolling Wall Street in 1790

In the autumn of 1780, Burr resumed his study of law with Thomas Smith of Haverstraw. He was licensed as an attorney in Albany, New York, in January 1782, and was admitted to the bar as a counselor that April. He promptly opened a successful law office in Albany. He moved his law practice to New York City the following year, after the British had evacuated the city.

Burr was a prominent lawyer, notably defending Levi Weeks in the Manhattan Well Murder trial of 1800, alongside Alexander Hamilton and Brockholst Livingston. Burr's address to the jury for the trial was, according to James Hardie, who kept an account of the trial, "one of the most masterly speeches, both with respect to composition and oratory," that Hardie had ever heard. Weeks was acquitted after only five minutes of jury deliberation. General Erastus Root concluded that Burr and Hamilton were "much the two greatest men in the state, perhaps in the nation."

Burr quickly became a key player in politics, especially in New York State, largely due to the influence of the Tammany Society (later Tammany Hall). Burr converted the organization from a social club into a political machine to help Thomas Jefferson reach the presidency, particularly in New York City.

=== Government ===
Burr served in the New York State Assembly from 1784 until 1785. In 1785, as an assemblyman, he unsuccessfully sought to completely abolish slavery through a bill that he introduced, despite having owned slaves himself. That same year, he opposed a gradual emancipation bill that would restrict the rights of freed African Americans, such as the ability to vote, intermarry or testify against white people, despite these rights having previously been guaranteed in the state constitution of 1777. This bill was also defeated. Burr appeared to "have viewed slavery as a temporary condition of servitude rather than a status based on racial inferiority." He also continued his military service as a lieutenant colonel and commander of Malcolm's Regiment. Burr became further involved in politics in 1789, when Governor George Clinton appointed him as New York State Attorney General. He was also Commissioner of Revolutionary War Claims.

In 1791, Burr was elected by the legislature as a United States Senator from New York, defeating incumbent General Philip Schuyler. During his time in the Senate, Burr made several Federalist enemies due to his beliefs, including his opposition to Hamilton's proposed financial system. During the 1795 debates on the Jay Treaty, Burr gave a speech illustrating his alignment with the Democratic-Republican Party; he would formally join the party prior to the end of his senatorial term. In Burr's last year of being a senator, he opposed Washington's foreign policy in Washington's Farewell Address. Rather than trying to be re-elected, Burr resigned from the Senate in 1797, after only one term.

Burr ran in the 1796 presidential election and received thirty electoral votes, coming in fourth behind John Adams, Thomas Jefferson and Thomas Pinckney. He was shocked by this defeat, but many Democratic-Republican electors voted for Jefferson or a candidate other than Burr.

President John Adams appointed Washington as commanding general of U.S. forces in 1798, but he rejected Burr's application for a brigadier general's commission during the Quasi-War with France. Washington wrote, "By all that I have known and heard, Colonel Burr is a brave and able officer, but the question is whether he has not equal talents at intrigue." Burr returned to the New York State Assembly in 1798 and served there through 1799. During this time, he cooperated with the Holland Land Company in gaining passage of a law to permit aliens to hold and convey lands. National parties became clearly defined during Adams' presidency, and Burr loosely associated himself with the Democratic-Republicans. However, he had moderate Federalist allies such as Senator Jonathan Dayton of New Jersey.

=== Manhattan Company ===
In September 1799, Burr founded his own bank, the Manhattan Company, and the enmity between him and Hamilton may have arisen from how he did so. Before the establishment of Burr's bank, the Federalists held a monopoly on banking interests in New York via the federal government's Bank of the United States and Hamilton's Bank of New York. These banks financed operations of significant business interests owned by aristocratic members of the city. Hamilton had prevented the formation of rival banks. Small businessmen relied on tontines to buy property and establish a voting voice. (Note: At this time, voting was based upon property rights.)

Burr used his power as the head of the New York State Assembly in order to convince his delegation to let a private company run the project as a doctor, Joseph Browne, had previously suggested. He solicited support from Hamilton and other Federalists under the guise that he was establishing a badly needed water company for Manhattan. He secretly changed the application for a state charter at the last minute to include the ability to invest surplus funds in any cause that did not violate state law, and dropped any pretense of founding a water company once he had gained approval, but he did dig a well and built a large working water storage tank on the site of his bank, which was still standing and apparently still working as late as 1898. Hamilton and other supporters believed that Burr had acted "dishonorably" by tricking them.

Meanwhile, construction was delayed on a safe water system for Manhattan, and writer Ron Chernow suggests that the delay may have contributed to deaths during a subsequent malaria epidemic. However, Museum of American Finance employees Maura Ferguson and Sarah Poole believe that the epidemic was not malaria, but yellow fever.

The Manhattan Company was more than a bank; it was a tool to promote Democratic-Republican power and influence, and its loans were directed to partisans. By extending credit to small businessmen, who then obtained enough property to gain the franchise to vote, the bank was able to increase the party's electorate. Federalist bankers in New York responded by trying to organize a credit boycott of Democratic-Republican businessmen.

Shortly after the bank's founding, Burr fought a duel with John Barker Church, whose wife Angelica was Hamilton's sister-in-law. Church had accused Burr of taking a bribe from the Holland Land Company in exchange for his political influence. Burr and Church fired at each other and missed, and afterward, Church acknowledged that he was wrong to have accused Burr without proof. Burr accepted this as an apology, and the two men shook hands and ended the dispute.

== 1800 presidential election ==
In the 1800 presidential election, Burr combined the political influence of the Manhattan Company with party campaign innovations to deliver New York State's support for Jefferson. That year, New York's state legislature chose the presidential electors, as they had four years earlier, when they gave their support to Adams. Prior to the April 1800 legislative elections, the State Assembly was controlled by the Federalists. The City of New York elected assembly members on an at-large basis. Burr and Hamilton were the key campaigners for their respective parties. Burr's Democratic-Republican slate of assemblymen was elected, giving the party control of the legislature, which in turn gave New York's electoral votes to Jefferson and Burr. This drove another wedge between Burr and Hamilton, who had developed a rivalry with Jefferson.

Burr enlisted the help of Tammany Hall to win the voting for selection of Electoral College delegates. He gained a place on the Democratic-Republican presidential ticket with Jefferson in the 1800 election. Jefferson and Burr won New York, and tied for the presidency overall, with 73 electoral votes each. Members of the Democratic-Republican Party understood they intended that Jefferson should be president and Burr vice president, but the tied vote required that the final choice be made by the U.S. House of Representatives, with each of the sixteen states having one vote, and nine votes needed for election.

Burr remained quiet publicly, refusing to surrender the presidency to Jefferson, who was seen as the great enemy of the Federalists. Rumors circulated that he and a faction of Federalists were encouraging Democratic-Republican representatives to vote for him, blocking Jefferson's election in the House. However, solid evidence of such a conspiracy was lacking, and historians generally gave Burr the benefit of the doubt. In 2011, however, historian Thomas Baker discovered a previously unknown letter from William P. Van Ness to Edward Livingston, two leading Democratic-Republicans in New York. Van Ness, a close confidant of Burr, secretly supported the Federalist plan to elect him as president and tried to enlist Livingston. Livingston initially agreed, then reversed himself. Baker argues that Burr probably supported Van Ness' plan: "There is a compelling pattern of circumstantial evidence, much of it newly discovered, that strongly suggests Aaron Burr did exactly that as part of a stealth campaign to compass the presidency for himself." The attempt did not work, however, at least in part because of Livingston's reversal and especially Hamilton's vigorous opposition to Burr. Jefferson was ultimately elected president, and Burr vice president.

== Vice presidency (1801–1805) ==
Jefferson never trusted Burr, so he was effectively shut out of party matters. As vice president, Burr earned praise from some enemies for his even-handedness and his judicial manner as President of the Senate; he fostered some practices for that office that have become time-honored traditions. Burr's judicial manner in presiding over the impeachment trial of Supreme Court Justice Samuel Chase has been credited as helping to preserve the principle of judicial independence that was established by Marbury v. Madison in 1803. One newspaper wrote that Burr had conducted the proceedings with the "impartiality of an angel, but with the rigor of a devil".

Burr was not nominated to a second term as Jefferson's running mate in the 1804 presidential election, and Clinton replaced Burr as vice president on March 4, 1805. Burr's farewell speech on March 2, 1805, moved some of his harshest critics in the Senate to tears. But the twenty-minute speech was never recorded in full, and has been preserved only in short quotes and descriptions of the address, which defended the American system of government.

=== Duel with Hamilton ===
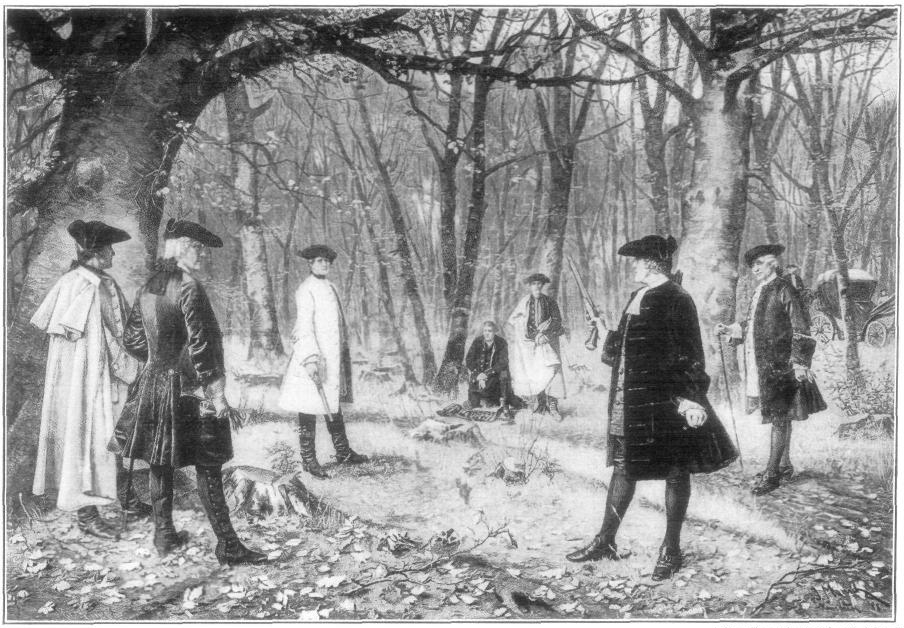
An early 20th century illustration after painting "Ein Ehrenhandel" by Joseph Munsch (Austrian, 1832-1896) depicting the duel between Burr (right) and Alexander Hamilton (left) on July 11, 1804, in Weehawken, New Jersey.

When it became clear that Jefferson would drop Burr from his ticket in the 1804 election, Burr ran for governor of New York instead. He lost the gubernatorial election to little-known Morgan Lewis, in what was the most significant margin of loss in the state's history up to that time. Burr blamed his loss on a personal smear campaign believed to have been orchestrated by his party rivals, including Clinton. Hamilton also opposed Burr, due to his belief that Burr had entertained a Federalist secession movement in New York. In April, the Albany Register newspaper published a letter from Dr. Charles D. Cooper to Senator Philip Schuyler, which relayed Hamilton's judgment that Burr was "a dangerous man and one who ought not to be trusted with the reins of government," and claiming to know of "a still more despicable opinion which General Hamilton has expressed of Mr. Burr". In June, Burr sent this letter to Hamilton, seeking an affirmation or disavowal of Cooper's characterization of Hamilton's remarks.

Hamilton replied that Burr should give specifics of his remarks, not Cooper's, and said he could not answer regarding Cooper's interpretation. A few more letters followed, in which the exchange escalated to Burr's demanding that Hamilton recant or deny any statement disparaging Burr's honor over the past fifteen years. Hamilton, meaning what he said and wanting to ensure his reputation stayed clean for the future, did not. According to historian Thomas Fleming, Burr would have immediately published such an apology, and Hamilton's remaining power in the New York's Federalist party would have been diminished. Burr responded by challenging Hamilton to a duel, personal combat then formalized under rules known as code duello.

Dueling was outlawed in New York, with bitter punishment awaiting any involved in dueling. It also was illegal in New Jersey, but the criminal ramifications were less severe. On July 11, 1804, the opponents met outside Weehawken, New Jersey, at the same location where Hamilton's oldest son, Philip Hamilton, had been killed in a duel three years earlier. Both men fired, and Hamilton was mortally wounded by a shot just above the hip.

Witnesses later disagreed on who fired first. They did agree that there was a three-to-four-second interval between the first and the second shot, raising difficult questions in evaluating the two camps' versions. Historian William Weir speculated that Hamilton might have been undone by his machinations: secretly setting his pistol's trigger to require only a half-pound of pressure as opposed to the usual ten pounds. Weir contends, "There is no evidence that Burr even knew that his pistol had a set trigger." Louisiana State University history professors Nancy Isenberg and Andrew Burstein concur with this, noting that "Hamilton brought the pistols, which had a larger barrel than regular dueling pistols, and a secret hair-trigger, and were therefore much more deadly," and conclude that "Hamilton gave himself an unfair advantage in their duel, and got the worst of it anyway." However, other accounts state that Hamilton reportedly responded "not this time" when his second, Nathaniel Pendleton, asked whether he would set the hair-trigger feature.

David O. Stewart, in his biography of Burr, notes that the reports of Hamilton's intentionally missing Burr with his shot began to be published in newspaper reports in papers aligned with Hamilton only in the days after his death. However, Ron Chernow, in his biography of Hamilton, states that Hamilton told numerous friends before the duel of his intention to avoid firing at Burr. Additionally, Hamilton wrote several letters, including a Statement on Impending Duel With Aaron Burr and his last missives to his wife dated before the duel, which also attest to his intention.

The second shot, witnesses reported, followed so soon after the first that witnesses could not agree on who fired first. Before the duel proper, Hamilton took a good deal of time getting used to the feel and weight of the pistol and putting on his glasses to see his opponent more clearly. The seconds placed Hamilton so that Burr would have the rising sun behind him, outlining Burr's body. Due to the sun being in his eyes, Hamilton put on his glasses. The positions put Hamilton at an advantage, likely to result in a deadly outcome for Burr. It is suspected that Burr did not know the gun had a hair trigger.

Each man took one shot. Burr's shot fatally injured Hamilton. While it is unclear whether Hamilton's was purposely fired into the air, Burr's bullet entered Hamilton's abdomen above his right hip, piercing his liver and spine. Hamilton was evacuated to the Manhattan residence of his friend, William Bayard Jr., where he and his family received visitors including Episcopal bishop Benjamin Moore, who gave Hamilton last rites. Burr was charged with multiple crimes, including murder, in New York and New Jersey, but was never tried in either jurisdiction.

Burr fled to South Carolina, where his daughter lived with her family, but soon returned to Philadelphia and then to Washington, D.C. to complete his term as vice president. He avoided New York and New Jersey for a time, but the charges against him were eventually dropped. In the case of New Jersey, the indictment was thrown out on the basis that, although Hamilton was shot in New Jersey, he died in New York.

== Post-vice presidency (1805–1836) ==
=== Conspiracy and trial ===
An 1860 survey of Louisiana showing "rejected claim of the Baron de Bastrop" along the Ouachita River

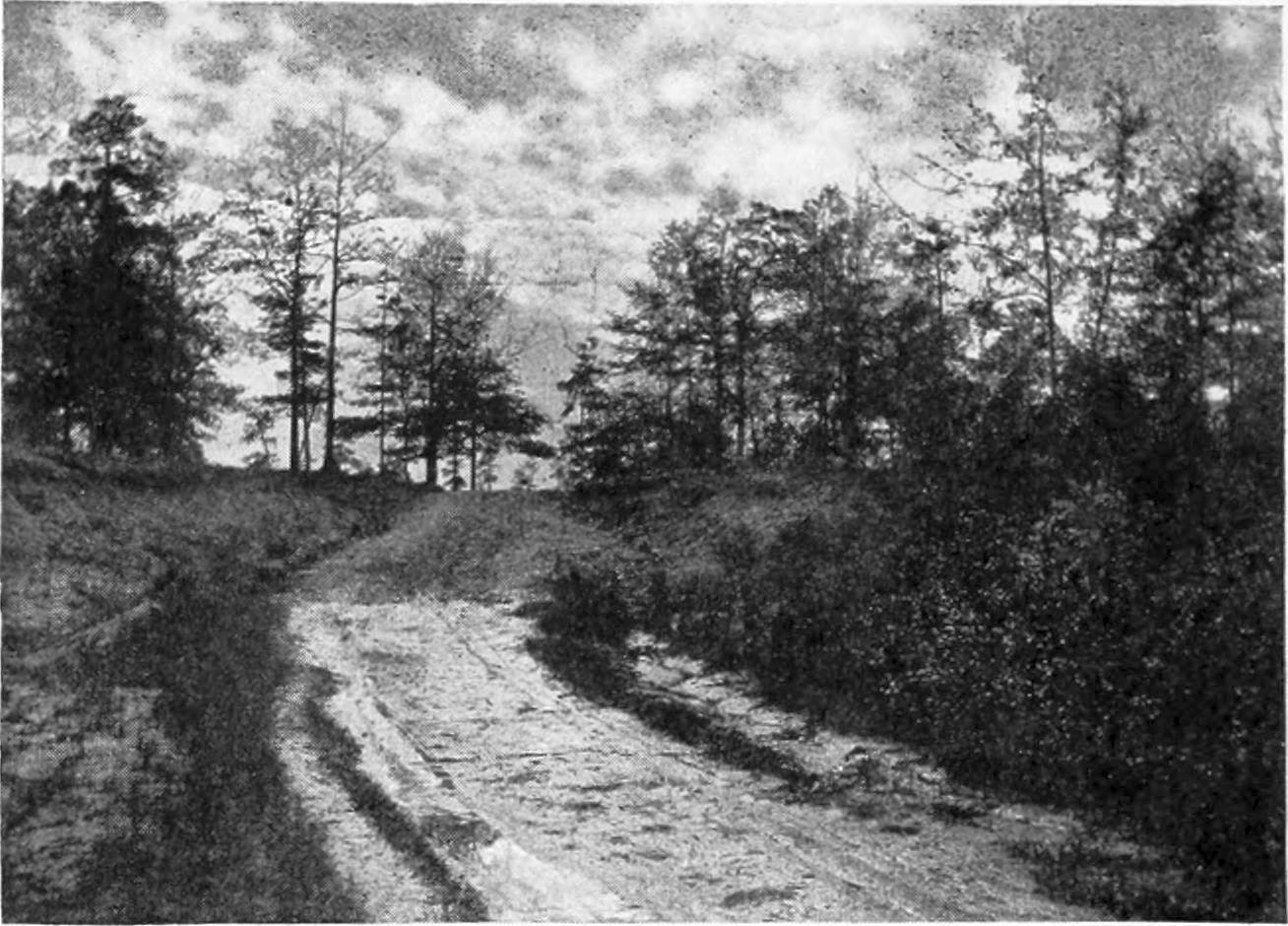
1904 photo illustration of the place near Wakefield, Alabama where soldiers arrested Aaron Burr in February 1807.

After Burr left the vice presidency at the end of his term in 1805, he journeyed to the western frontier, areas west of the Allegheny Mountains and down the Ohio River Valley, eventually reaching the lands acquired in the Louisiana Purchase. He leased 40,000 acres (16,000 ha) of land, known as the Bastrop Tract, along the Ouachita River, in present-day Louisiana, from the Kingdom of Spain. Starting in Pittsburgh and then proceeding to Beaver, Pennsylvania, and Wheeling, Virginia, and onward, he drummed up support for his planned settlement, whose purpose and status was unclear.

Burr's most important contact was General James Wilkinson, commander-in-chief of the United States Army at New Orleans and governor of the Louisiana Territory. Wilkinson later proved to be a bad choice. Others included Harman Blennerhassett, who offered the use of his private island for training and outfitting Burr's expedition.

Burr envisioned the probability of war between the U.S. and Spain. In case war was declared, Andrew Jackson, then commander of Tennessee's militia, stood ready to assist Burr. Burr's expedition of about eighty men carried modest arms for hunting, and no war materiel was ever revealed even when Blennerhassett Island was seized by Ohio's militia. Burr vowed the aim of his conspiracy was that if he settled there with a large group of armed farmers and war broke out, he would likely face a force with which to fight and claim land for himself thereby restoring his wealth. However, the war did not emerge as soon as Burr expected. In 1819, the Adams–Onís Treaty secured Florida for the U.S. without a fight, and war in Texas did not commence until 1836, the year Burr died.

After a near-incident with Spanish forces at Natchitoches, Wilkinson decided he could best protect himself by betraying Burr's plans to his Spanish spymasters and to President Jefferson. Jefferson issued an order for Burr's arrest, declaring him a traitor before any indictment. Burr read this in a newspaper in the Territory of Orleans on January 10, 1807. Several journals reported on the subject, creating a pool of rumors, most against Burr. Jefferson's warrant put federal agents on his trail. Burr twice turned himself in to federal authorities, and both times judges found his actions legal and released him.

Jefferson's warrant, however, followed Burr, who fled toward Spanish Florida. He was intercepted at Wakefield, in Mississippi Territory (present-day Alabama), on February 19, 1807, by Edmund P. Gaines and Nicholas Perkins III. He was confined to Fort Stoddert after being arrested on charges of treason.

Burr's secret correspondence with Anthony Merry and the Marquis of Casa Yrujo, the British and Spanish ministers in Washington, were eventually revealed. Burr had tried to secure money and conceal what may have been his true design, which was aiding Mexico in overthrowing Spain's governance of the Southwest. If Burr intended to establish a dynasty in what later became Mexican territory, such an offense at the time was a misdemeanor under the Neutrality Act of 1794, which Congress passed to block filibuster expeditions against U.S. neighbors, including those of George Rogers Clark and William Blount. Despite this, Jefferson sought the highest charges against Burr.

In 1807, Burr was charged with treason in U.S. circuit court in Richmond, Virginia. His defense lawyers included Edmund Randolph, John Wickham, Luther Martin and Benjamin Gaines Botts. Burr was arraigned four times for treason prior to being indicted before a grand jury. The only physical evidence presented to the grand jury was Wilkinson's letter from Burr, which proposed stealing land in the Louisiana Purchase. During the grand jury's deliberations, however, the court discovered that the letter was written in Wilkinson's handwriting; he said he had made a copy because he had lost the original. The grand jury dismissed the letter out as evidence, and the news made a laughingstock of Wilkinson for the rest of the proceedings.

The trial, which was presided over by Chief Justice John Marshall, began on August 3. Article 3, Section 3 of the U.S. Constitution requires that treason either be admitted in open court or proven by an overt act witnessed by two people. Since no witnesses came forward, Burr was acquitted on September 1, despite efforts by the Jefferson administration to exert its political influence against him in the trial. Burr was immediately tried on a misdemeanor charge and was again acquitted.

Jefferson used his influence as president to seek Burr's conviction, leading the trial to be seen as a major test of the U.S. Constitution and the separation of powers. Jefferson challenged the authority of the Supreme Court and Chief Justice Marshall, who had been appointed by Adams and clashed with Jefferson over Adams' last-minute judicial appointments. Jefferson believed that Burr's treason was obvious. Burr sent a letter to Jefferson in which he stated that he could do the president much harm. The case, as tried, was decided on whether Burr was present at certain events at certain times and in certain capacities. Jefferson used all of his personal influence in an attempt to convince Marshall to convict Burr, but the chief justice was not swayed. Burr was found not proven to be guilty by the jury due to the lack of evidence against him.

Historians Nancy Isenberg and Andrew Burstein write that Burr:

was not guilty of treason, nor was he ever convicted, because there was no evidence, not one credible piece of testimony, and the star witness for the prosecution had to admit that he had doctored a letter implicating Burr.

David O. Stewart, on the other hand, alleged that Burr was not explicitly guilty of treason, according to Marshall's definition, but evidence existed linking him to treasonous crimes. Bollman admitted to Jefferson during an interrogation that Burr planned to raise an army and invade Mexico. He said that Burr believed that he should be Mexico's monarch, since a republican government, in Burr's view, was not appropriate for Mexico.

=== Exile and return ===
By the conclusion of his trial for treason, despite an acquittal, all of Burr's hopes for a political comeback had been dashed, and he fled America and his creditors for Europe. Dr. David Hosack, Hamilton's physician and a friend to both Hamilton and Burr, lent Burr money for passage on a ship.

Burr lived in self-imposed exile from 1808 to 1812, passing most of this period in England, where he occupied a house on Craven Street, London. He became a friend and confidant to the English Utilitarian philosopher Jeremy Bentham, and on occasion lived at Bentham's home. Burr also spent time in Scotland, Denmark, Sweden, Germany and France. Ever hopeful, he solicited funding for renewing his plans for a conquest of Mexico but was rebuffed. Burr was ordered out of England and Emperor Napoleon of France refused to receive him.

After returning from Europe, Burr used the surname "Edwards", his mother's maiden name, to avoid creditors. With help from old friends Samuel Swartwout and Matthew L. Davis, he returned to New York City and his law practice. Later, Burr helped the heirs of the Eden family in a financial lawsuit. By the early 1820s, the remaining members of the Eden household, Eden's widow and two daughters, had become a surrogate family to Burr.

=== Later life ===
In 1809, while at lodgings in Stockholm, Sweden, Burr attempted to light a candle with gunpowder from a firearm he owned. In a diary entry, Burr explained that he attempted to light the candle using shreds of tinder, but was unable to do so. Instead, he turned to his gun, and checked whether it was loaded (it was). Burr removed the ammunition and lit the candle after nearly 50 failed attempts, lighting his shirt, fingers and papers on fire in the process.

Despite financial setbacks, Burr lived out the remainder of his life in New York in relative peace until 1833. On July 1 of that year, at age 77, he married Eliza Jumel, a wealthy widow who was nineteen years his junior. They lived together briefly at the residence which she had acquired with her first husband: the Morris-Jumel Mansion in the Washington Heights neighborhood of Manhattan. Listed on the National Register of Historic Places, it is now preserved and open to the public.

Soon after the marriage, Jumel realized her fortune was dwindling due to Burr's land speculation losses, and separated from him after four months of marriage. The apocryphal story is that she chose Alexander Hamilton Jr. as her divorce lawyer in 1834, the same year Burr suffered an immobilizing stroke.

== Personal life ==
In addition to his daughter Theodosia, Burr was the father of at least three other biological children and two adopted sons. He also acted as a parent to his two stepsons by his wife's first marriage and he became a mentor or guardian to several protégés who lived in his home.

=== Burr's daughter Theodosia ===
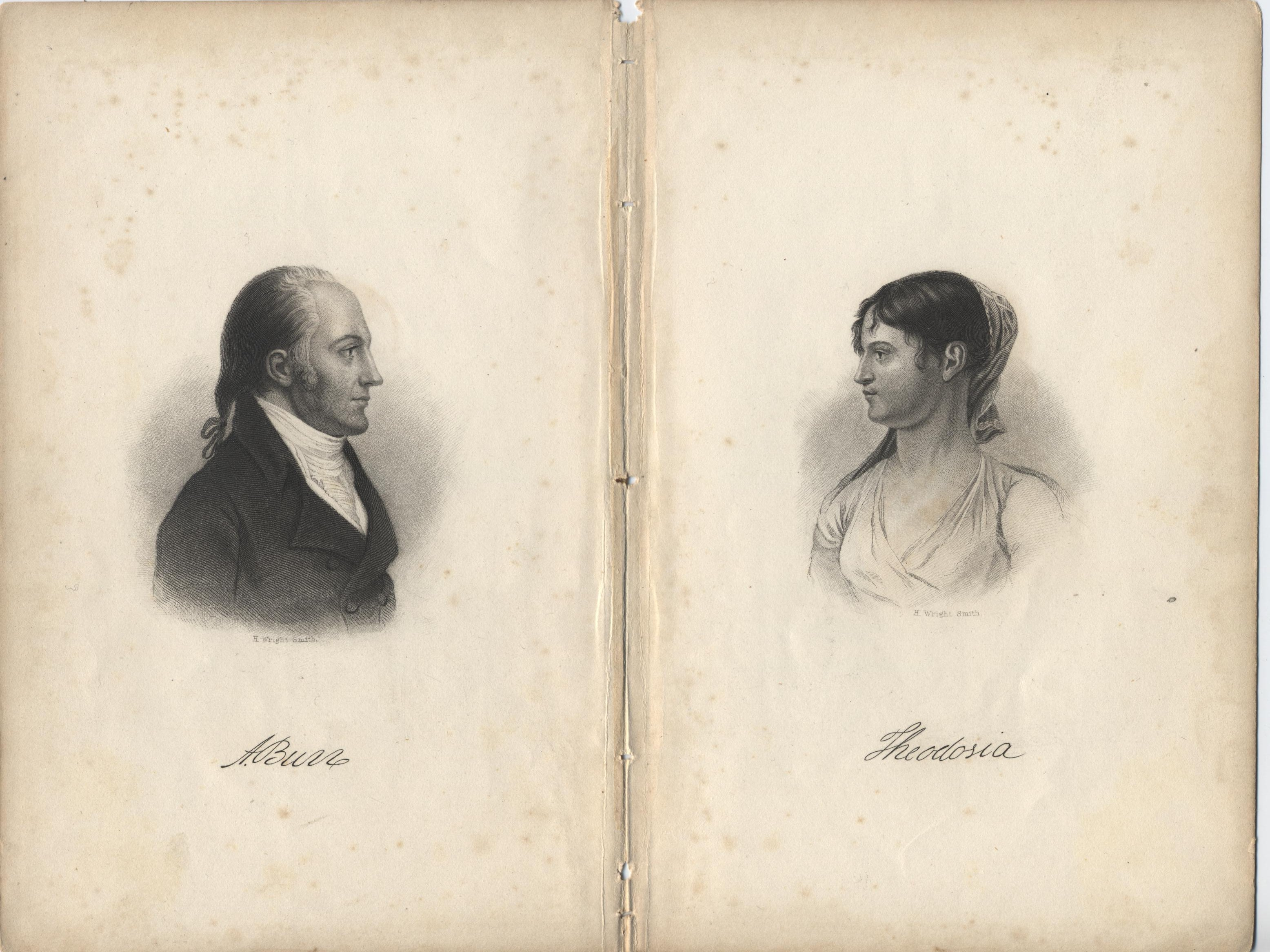
Burr and his daughter Theodosia

Theodosia Burr Alston was born in 1783 and was named after her mother. She was the only child of Burr's marriage to Theodosia Bartow Prevost who survived to adulthood. A second daughter, Sally, lived to the age of three. Two unnamed stillborns arrived later, with the first son in February 1787 and the second on July 9, 1788.

Burr was a devoted and attentive father to Theodosia. Believing that a young woman should have an education equal to that of a young man, he prescribed a rigorous course of studies for her which included the classics, French, horsemanship and music. Their surviving correspondence indicates that he affectionately treated his daughter as a close friend and confidante as long as she lived. Theodosia was devoted to her father as well, once having wrote to him "...you appear to me so superior, so elevated above all other men..."

Theodosia became widely known for her education and accomplishments. In 1801, she married Joseph Alston of South Carolina. They had a son together, Aaron Burr Alston, in 1802. In 1812, the young boy died of malaria at age ten. Following her son's death, Theodosia sent a letter to her father, stating, "...there is no more joy for me, the world is a blank. I have lost my boy. My child is gone forever. He expired on the 30th of June."

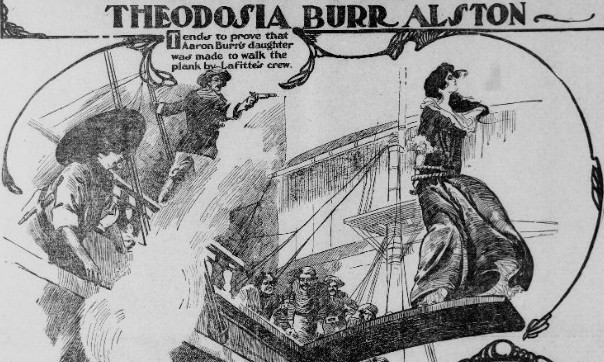
The San Francisco Call's cartoon about Theodosia's possible fate.

During the winter of 1812–1813, Theodosia was lost at sea with the schooner Patriot off the Carolina coast. Although it is unknown what truly happened to Theodosia and the other passengers, the most common theories are that they were either murdered by pirates or shipwrecked in a storm. Burr and Alston personally chose to believe the theory that she had died in a storm, not wanting to think their beloved had been murdered.

=== Stepchildren and protégés ===
Upon Burr's marriage, he became stepfather to the two teenage sons of his wife's first marriage. Augustine James Frederick Prevost (called "Frederick") and John Bartow Prevost had both joined their father in the Royal American Regiment in December 1780, at the ages of 16 and 14. When they returned in 1783 to become citizens of the United States, Burr acted as a father to them: he assumed responsibility for their education, gave both of them clerkships in his law office and frequently was accompanied by one of them as an assistant when he traveled on business. John was later appointed by Jefferson to a post in the Territory of Orleans as the first judge of the Louisiana Supreme Court.

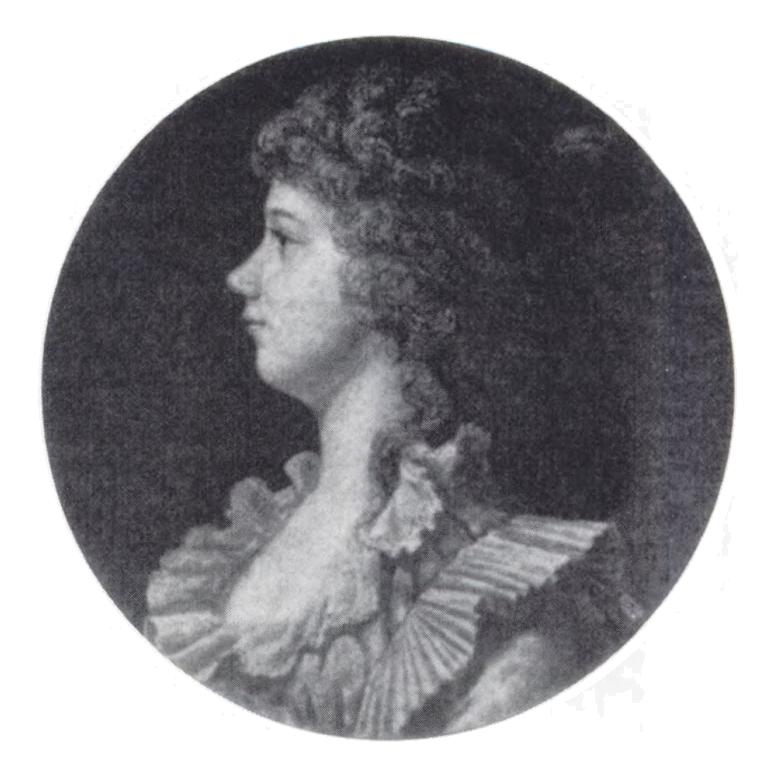
Nathalie de Lage de Volude

Burr served as a guardian to Nathalie de Lage de Volude (1782–1841) from 1794 to 1801, during Theodosia's childhood. The young daughter of a French marquis, Nathalie was taken to New York for safety during the French Revolution by her governess, Caroline de Senat. Burr opened his home to them, allowing Madame Senat to tutor private students there along with his daughter, and Nathalie became a companion and close friend to Theodosia. While traveling to France for an extended visit in 1801, Nathalie met Thomas Sumter Jr., a diplomat and the son of General Thomas Sumter. They married in Paris in March 1802, before returning to his home in South Carolina. From 1810 to 1821 they lived in Rio de Janeiro, where Sumter served as the American ambassador to Portugal during the transfer of the Portuguese Court to Brazil. One of their children, Thomas De Lage Sumter, was a congressman from South Carolina.

In the 1790s, Burr also took the painter John Vanderlyn into his home as a protégé, and provided him with financial support and patronage for twenty years. He arranged Vanderlyn's training by Gilbert Stuart in Philadelphia and sent him in 1796 to the École des Beaux-Arts in Paris, where he remained for six years.

=== Adopted and acknowledged children ===
Burr adopted two sons, Aaron Columbus Burr and Charles Burdett, during the 1810s and 1820s after the death of his daughter Theodosia. Aaron (born Aaron Burr Columbe) was born in Paris in 1808 and arrived in the U.S. around 1815, and Charles was born in 1814. Both of the boys were reputed to be Burr's biological sons. A Burr biographer described Aaron as "the product of a Paris adventure", conceived presumably during Burr's exile from the United States between 1808 and 1814.

In 1835, the year before his death, Burr acknowledged two young daughters whom he had fathered late in his life, by different mothers. Burr made specific provisions for his surviving daughters in a will dated January 11, 1835, in which he left "all the rest and residue" of his estate, after other specific bequests, to six-year-old Frances Ann (born c. 1829), and two-year-old Elizabeth (born c. 1833).

=== Unacknowledged children ===
In 1787 or earlier, Burr began a relationship with Mary Emmons, who was East Indian, likely of Bengali ethnicity. She worked as a servant in his household during his first marriage. She came from Calcutta to Saint-Domingue (modern-day Haiti), where she had lived under the adopted name Eugénie Beauharnais before coming to the U.S. and taking on the name Mary Emmons. Burr fathered two children with Emmons, both of whom married into Philadelphia's "Free Negro" community in which their families became prominent:

- Louisa Burr (Webb) (Darius) (c. 1784-1878) worked most of her life as a valued servant in the home of Elizabeth Powel Francis Fisher, a prominent Philadelphia society matron, and later in the home of her son Joshua Francis Fisher. She was married to Francis Webb (1788–1829), a founding member of the Pennsylvania Augustine Education Society, secretary of the Haytien Emigration Society formed in 1824, and distributor of Freedom's Journal from 1827 to 1829. After his death, Louisa remarried and became Louisa Darius. Her youngest son Frank J. Webb wrote the 1857 novel The Garies and Their Friends.
- John Pierre Burr (c. 1792–1864) became a member of Philadelphia's Underground Railroad and served as an agent for the abolitionist newspaper The Liberator. He worked in the National Black Convention movement and served as chairman of the American Moral Reform Society.

One contemporary of John Pierre Burr identified him as a natural son of Burr in a published account, but Burr never acknowledged his relationship or children with Emmons during his life, in contrast to his adoption or acknowledgment of other children born later in his life.

In 2018, Louisa and John were acknowledged by the Aaron Burr Association as the children of Burr after Sherri Burr, a descendant of John Pierre, provided both documentary evidence and results of a DNA test to confirm a familial link between descendants of Burr and descendants of Pierre. The Association installed a headstone at Pierre's grave to mark his ancestry. Stuart Fisk Johnson, the president of the Association, commented, "A few people didn't want to go into it because Aaron's first wife, Theodosia, was still alive, and dying of cancer [when Aaron fathered Pierre] ... But the embarrassment is not as important as it is to acknowledge and embrace actual living, robust, accomplished children."

== Character ==
Burr was a man of complex character who made many friends, but also many powerful enemies. He was indicted for murder after the death of Hamilton, but never prosecuted; he was reported by acquaintances to be curiously unmoved by Hamilton's death, expressing no regret for his role in the result. He was arrested and prosecuted for treason by President Jefferson, but acquitted. Although the charges were dropped, Burr remained distrusted by contemporaries for the rest of his life.

In his later years in New York, Burr provided money and education for several children, some of whom were reputed to be his natural children. To his friends and family, and often to strangers, he could be kind and generous. Jane Fairfield, the wife of the struggling poet Sumner Lincoln Fairfield, recorded in her autobiography that in the late 1820s, Burr pawned his watch to provide for the care of the Fairfields' two children. Jane wrote that, while traveling, she and her husband had left the children in New York with their grandmother, who proved unable to provide adequate food or heat for them. The grandmother took the children to Burr's home and asked his help: "[Burr] wept, and replied, 'Though I am poor and have not a dollar, the children of such a mother shall not suffer while I have a watch.' He hastened on this godlike errand, and quickly returned, having pawned the article for twenty dollars, which he gave to make comfortable my precious babes."

By Fairfield's account, Burr had lost his religious faith before that time; upon seeing a painting of Jesus' suffering, Burr candidly told her, "It is a fable, my child; there never was such a being."

Burr believed women to be intellectually equal to men and was a supporter of Mary Wollstonecraft's feminist ideas, additionally having commissioned a portrait of her. Burr's daughter, Theodosia, was taught dance, music, several languages and learned to shoot from horseback. Until her death at sea in 1813, she remained devoted to her father. Not only did Burr advocate education for women, upon his election to the New York legislature, he submitted a bill, which failed to pass, that would have allowed women to vote. Hamilton attacked Burr for supporting the idea that women were the intellectual equals of men.

Burr was considered a notorious womanizer. In addition to cultivating relationships with women in his social circles, his journals indicate that he was a frequent patron of prostitutes during his travels in Europe; he recorded brief notes of dozens of such encounters, and the amounts he paid. He described "sexual release as the only remedy for his restlessness and irritability". Along with journals of his own, during the 1804 gubernatorial election, one of his enemies, James Cheetham, stated he had a list of "the top 20 prostitutes in New York City", all of whom mentioned they had Burr as a customer and favored him over the others.

Burr also fought against anti-immigrant sentiment, led by Hamilton's Federalist party, which suggested that anyone without English heritage was a second-class citizen and even challenged the rights of non-Anglos to hold office. In response, Burr insisted that anyone who contributed to society deserved all the rights of any other citizen, no matter their background.

John Adams had frequently defended Burr during his life. He wrote, Burr "had served in the army, and came out of it with the character of a knight without fear and an able officer".

Gordon S. Wood, a leading scholar of the revolutionary period, holds that it was Burr's character that put him at odds with the rest of the Founding Fathers, especially Jefferson, Hamilton and James Madison. He believed that this led to his personal and political defeats and, ultimately, to his place outside the golden circle of revered revolutionary figures. Because of his habit of placing self-interest above the good of the whole, those men thought that Burr represented a serious threat to the ideals for which they had fought the revolution. Their ideal, as particularly embodied in Washington and Jefferson, was that of "disinterested politics", a government led by educated gentlemen. They would fulfill their duties in a spirit of public virtue and without regard to personal interests or pursuits. This was the core of an Enlightenment gentleman, and Burr's political enemies thought that he lacked that essential core. Hamilton thought that Burr's self-serving nature made him unfit to hold office, especially the presidency. Hamilton believed it "a religious duty to oppose his [Burr's] career", as he wrote in 1792.

Although Hamilton considered Jefferson a political enemy, he also believed him a man of public virtue. Hamilton conducted an unrelenting campaign in the House of Representatives to prevent Burr's election to the presidency and gain election of his erstwhile enemy, Jefferson. Hamilton characterized Burr as exceedingly immoral, as well as "unprincipled & dangerous". Hamilton deemed Burr's political quest as one for "permanent power". He contended that Burr cared little about the Constitution and predicted that if he gained any more power, his leadership would continue to be for personal gain, while Jefferson was a true patriot and public servant committed to preserving the Constitution.

== Death ==
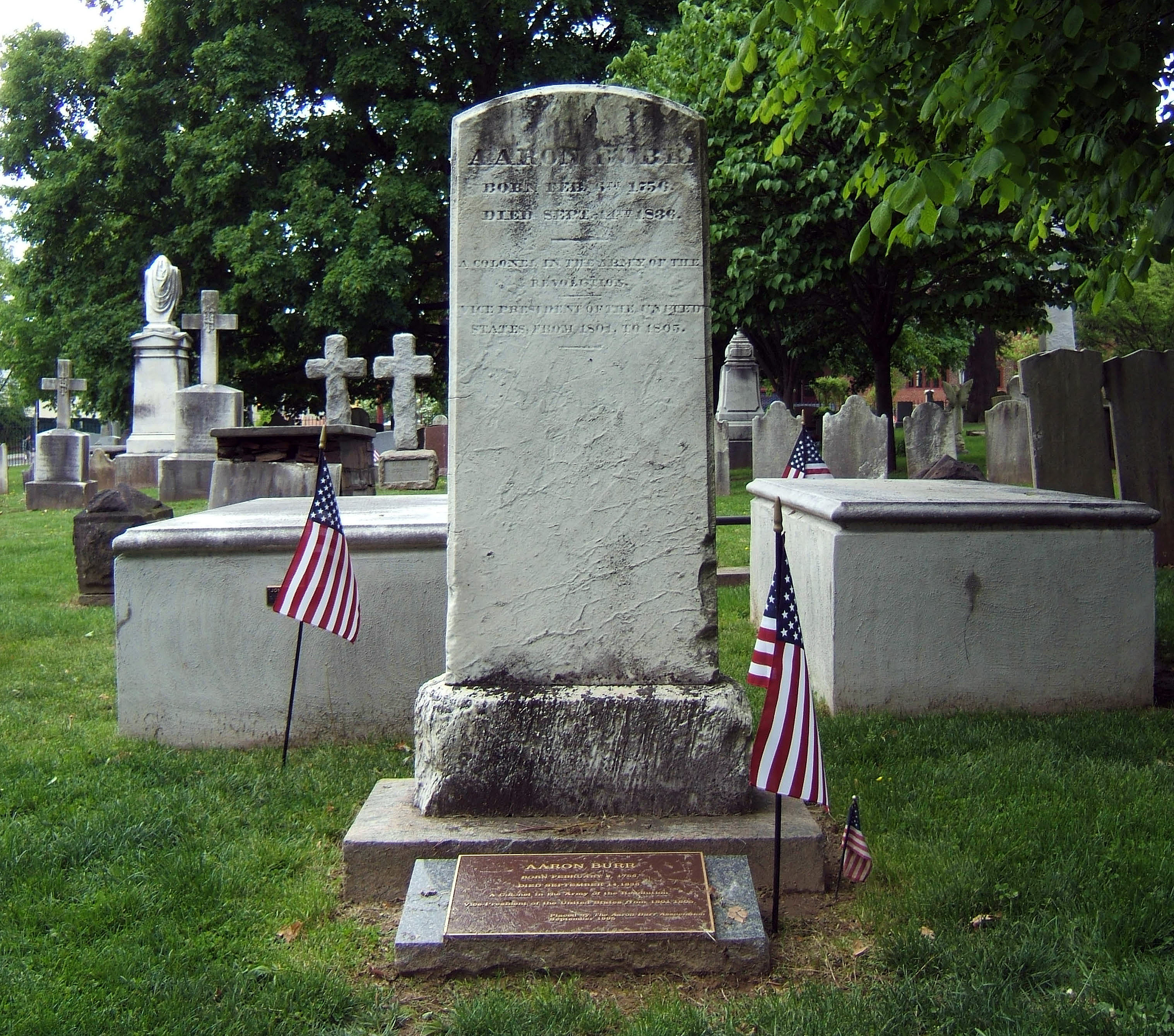
Burr's burial site in Princeton, New Jersey

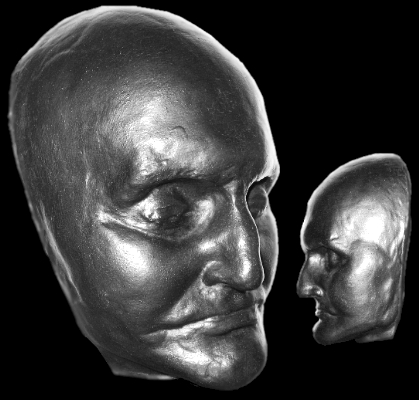
Burr's death mask

Burr died in a boarding home after suffering two strokes in Port Richmond, Staten Island, (now New York City), on September 14, 1836, at age 80, the same day that his divorce was officially completed. He died deeply in debt. The boarding house later became known as the St. James Hotel. Burr was buried near his father's gravesite in Princeton, New Jersey.

John Quincy Adams wrote in his diary a year after Burr's death: "Burr's life, take it all together, was such as in any country of sound morals his friends would be desirous of burying in quiet oblivion."

== Legacy ==
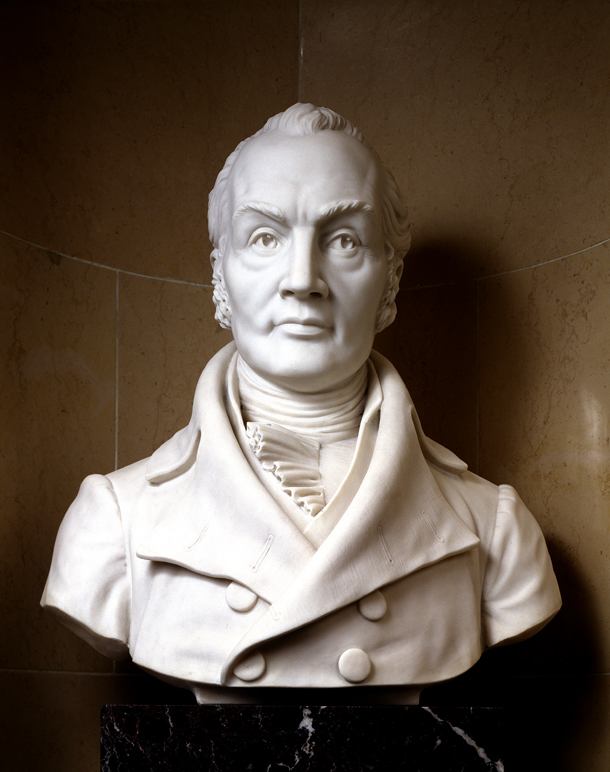
Bust of Burr as vice president

Although Burr is often remembered primarily for his duel with Hamilton, his establishment of guides and rules for the first impeachment trial set a high bar for behavior and procedures in the Senate chamber, many of which are followed today.

Historian Nancy Isenberg, seeking to explain Burr's negative image in modern times, wrote that his portrayal as a villain is actually the result of a smear campaign invented by his political enemies centuries ago, and then disseminated in newspapers, pamphlets and personal letters during and after his lifetime. According to Isenberg, popular portrayals of Burr have repeated these distortions, transforming him into the quintessential "bad guy" of early American history. Stuart Fisk Johnson describes Burr as progressive thinker, a brave military patriot and brilliant lawyer who helped establish some of the physical infrastructure and guiding legal principles which helped in the founding of America.

A lasting consequence of Burr's role in the election of 1800 was the Twelfth Amendment to the United States Constitution, which changed how vice presidents were chosen. As was evident from the 1800 election, the situation could quickly arise where the vice president, as the defeated presidential candidate, could not work well with the president. The Twelfth Amendment required that electoral votes be cast separately for president and vice president.

Burr is also sometimes seen as one of the Founding Fathers of the United States because of his actions in the Revolutionary War and because of his role in the founding of the Twelfth Amendment. However, this characterization is unusual due to his controversial legacy, such as the Burr-Hamilton duel and the Burr conspiracy.

=== Representation in literature and popular culture ===
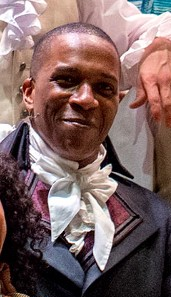
Leslie Odom Jr. as Burr in Hamilton

- An erotic, fictionalized biography of Burr's life, The Amorous Intrigues and Adventures of Aaron Burr, was anonymously published in 1861.
- Edward Everett Hale's 1863 story "The Man Without a Country" is about a fictional co-conspirator of Burr's in the Southwest and Mexico, who is placed in internal exile (in the custody of the United States Navy) for his crimes.
- The 'Treason' of Aaron Burr (1807) was an episode of the TV series You Are There.
- Gore Vidal's Burr: A Novel (1973) is part of his Narratives of Empire series.
- PBS's American Experience episode "The Duel" (2000) chronicled the events that led to the Burr–Hamilton duel.
- Burr is a principal character in the 2015 biographical musical Hamilton, written by Lin-Manuel Miranda and inspired by historian Ron Chernow's 2004 biography of Hamilton. Leslie Odom Jr. won the Tony Award for Best Actor in a Musical for his portrayal of Aaron Burr on Broadway. Giles Terera portrayed Aaron Burr in the West End production, winning the Laurence Olivier Award in the same category. Burr has also been portrayed in the Broadway company of Hamilton by Brandon Victor Dixon, Daniel Breaker, Jin Ha, Nik Walker, and Nicholas Christopher, and in touring companies by Joshua Henry and Wayne Brady.
- In the alternative history anthology Alternate Presidents (1992) by Mike Resnick, there is the short story "The War of '07" by Jayge Carr, where Burr is elected the third president in 1800 against Jefferson, establishes an alliance with Napoleon Bonaparte and creates a family dictatorship. Burr serves as president for nine terms until his death on September 14, 1836. His grandson and final vice president, Aaron Burr Alston, becomes the fourth president of the United States.
- A 1993 "Got Milk?" commercial directed by Michael Bay, "Aaron Burr", features a history buff obsessed with the study of Burr—he owns the guns and the bullet from the duel. A radio host announces a $10,000 question, "Who shot Alexander Hamilton in that famous duel?" The history buff's phone rings and, despite having answered correctly by naming Burr, is unintelligible due to having a mouth full of a peanut butter sandwich. He tries to wash down the sandwich with some milk, but his milk carton is empty and the radio host hangs up. A parody of the commercial was made in 2015, with the history buff being played by the actor who originally portrayed Burr in the Broadway musical Hamilton, Leslie Odom Jr.
- "The Aaron Burr Story" was an episode of the "Daniel Boone" TV show wherein Boone apprehends Burr during Burr and his loyalist's journey west to set up his new empire "west of the Alleghenies."

== Notes ==
New York State Assembly
Preceded by Robert Harpur, Henry Hughes, John Lamb, William Malcom, Henry Rutgers, Isaac Sear, John Stagg, Peter P. Van Zandt, Marinus Willett	Member of the New York State Assembly from New York County; 1784–1785; Served alongside: William Denning, Daniel Dunscomb, William Goforth, John Laurance, Peter Van Brugh Livingston, Thomas Randall, Henry Remsen, Comfort Sands	Succeeded by Evert Bancker, Robert Boyd, William Denning, William Duer, William Goforth, William Malcom, Isaac Sears, John Stagg, Robert Troup
Legal offices
Preceded by Richard Varick	Attorney General of New York; 1789–1791	Succeeded by Morgan Lewis
U.S. Senate
Preceded by Philip Schuyler	U.S. Senator (Class 1) from New York; 1791–1797; Served alongside: Rufus King, John Laurance	Succeeded by Philip Schuyler
Party political offices
Preceded by George Clinton^{1}	Democratic-Republican nominee for Vice President of the United States; 1796, 1800^{2, 3}	Succeeded by George Clinton
Political offices
Preceded by Thomas Jefferson	Vice President of the United States; 1801–1805	Succeeded by George Clinton
Notes and references
1. In 1792, with George Washington as the candidate favored to be elected president, the Democratic-Republican Party nominated George Clinton; their intention was that he be elected vice president.; 2. Before passage of the Twelfth Amendment, in 1804, each presidential elector would cast two votes; the candidate who received a majority of votes would become president and the runner-up would become vice president.; 3. Aaron Burr was a presidential candidate in the elections in 1796 and 1800, although the Democratic-Republican Party also nominated Thomas Jefferson; their intention was that Jefferson be elected president and Burr be elected vice president.
