= Carol Karlsen =

American historian (born 1940)

Carol F. Karlsen (born 15 December 1940) is an American historian.

== Career ==
She received her B.A. degree from the University of Maryland in 1970, her M.A. degree from New York University in 1972, and her Ph.D. degree from Yale University in 1980.

Her books have received mostly positive reviews. She was awarded a Guggenheim Fellowship in 1989.

== Bibliography ==
Some of her books are:

- The Devil in the Shape of a Woman: Witchcraft in Colonial New England
- The Journal of Esther Edwards Burr, 1754-1757
