= Governor Prevost =

Governor Prevost may refer to:

- Jacques Marcus Prevost (1736–1781), 9th Colonial Governor of Georgia in 1779
- George Prevost (1767–1816), Governor General of the Canadas from 1812 to 1815
