= William Alston (South Carolina) =

American politician

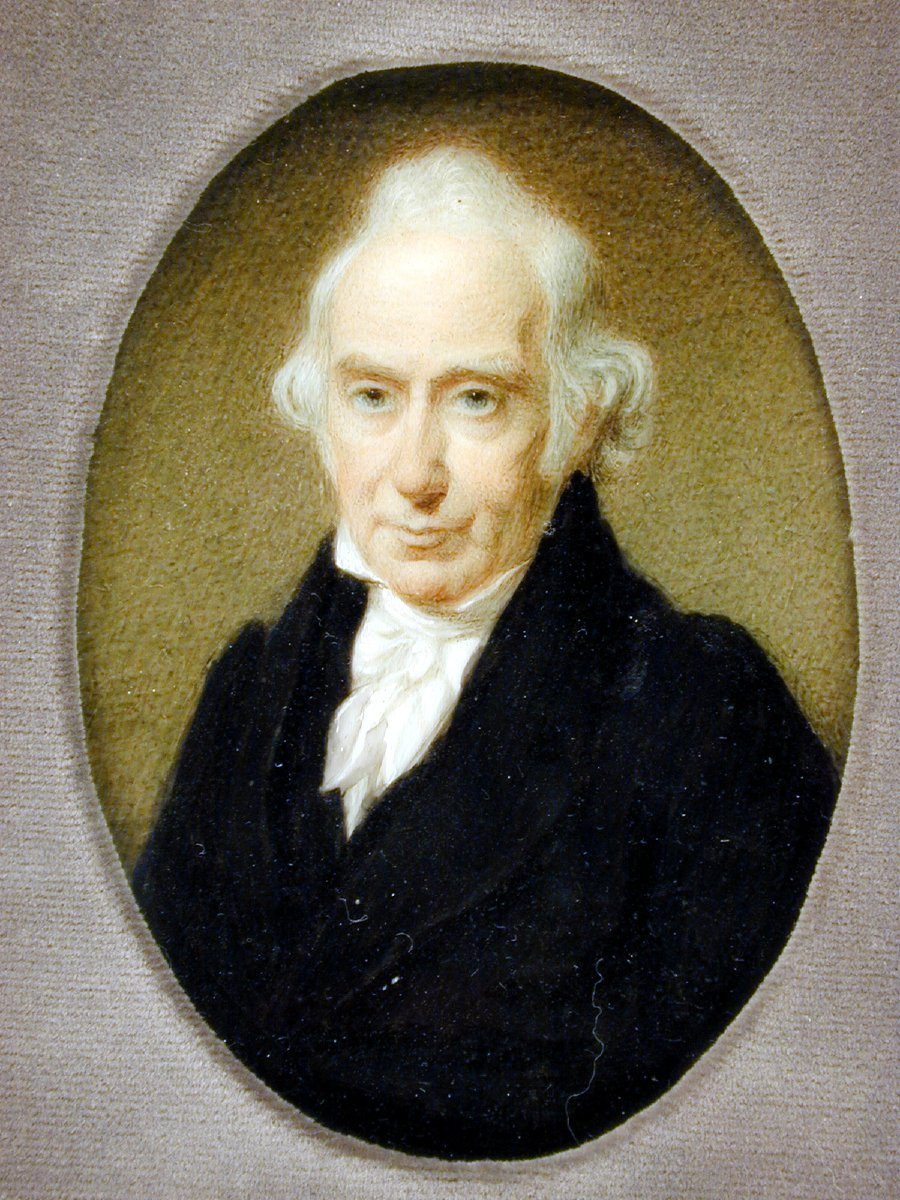
- Born: 1757; Charleston
- Died: June 26, 1839 (aged 81–82); Charleston
- Resting place: Murrells Inlet
- Occupation: Legislator, politician, soldier
- Spouse(s): Mary Brewton Motte Alston
- Children: Joseph Alston
- Position held: member of the State Senate of South Carolina (1784–)
- Rank: captain, Colonel

William Alston (1757 – June 26, 1839) was a South Carolina legislator, slave owner, planter, and horse breeder.

William Alston was born on 1757. He was a captain during the revolutionary war under Francis Marion, the famous partisan leader. After the return of peace he married the daughter of Rebecca Motte, and became a successful planter and a large slave-owner. He was for many years a member of the South Carolina senate.

His son Joseph Alston was for several years a prominent member of the South Carolina state legislature, and governor in 1812–1814. Joseph Alston married Theodosia, daughter of Aaron Burr.

William Alston died on 26 June 1839 in Charleston, South Carolina.
