= Trinity Church Cemetery =

Cemeteries in Manhattan, New York

- The Trinity Church Downtown Churchyards & Uptown Cemetery
- U.S. National Register of Historic Places
- New York State Register of Historic Places
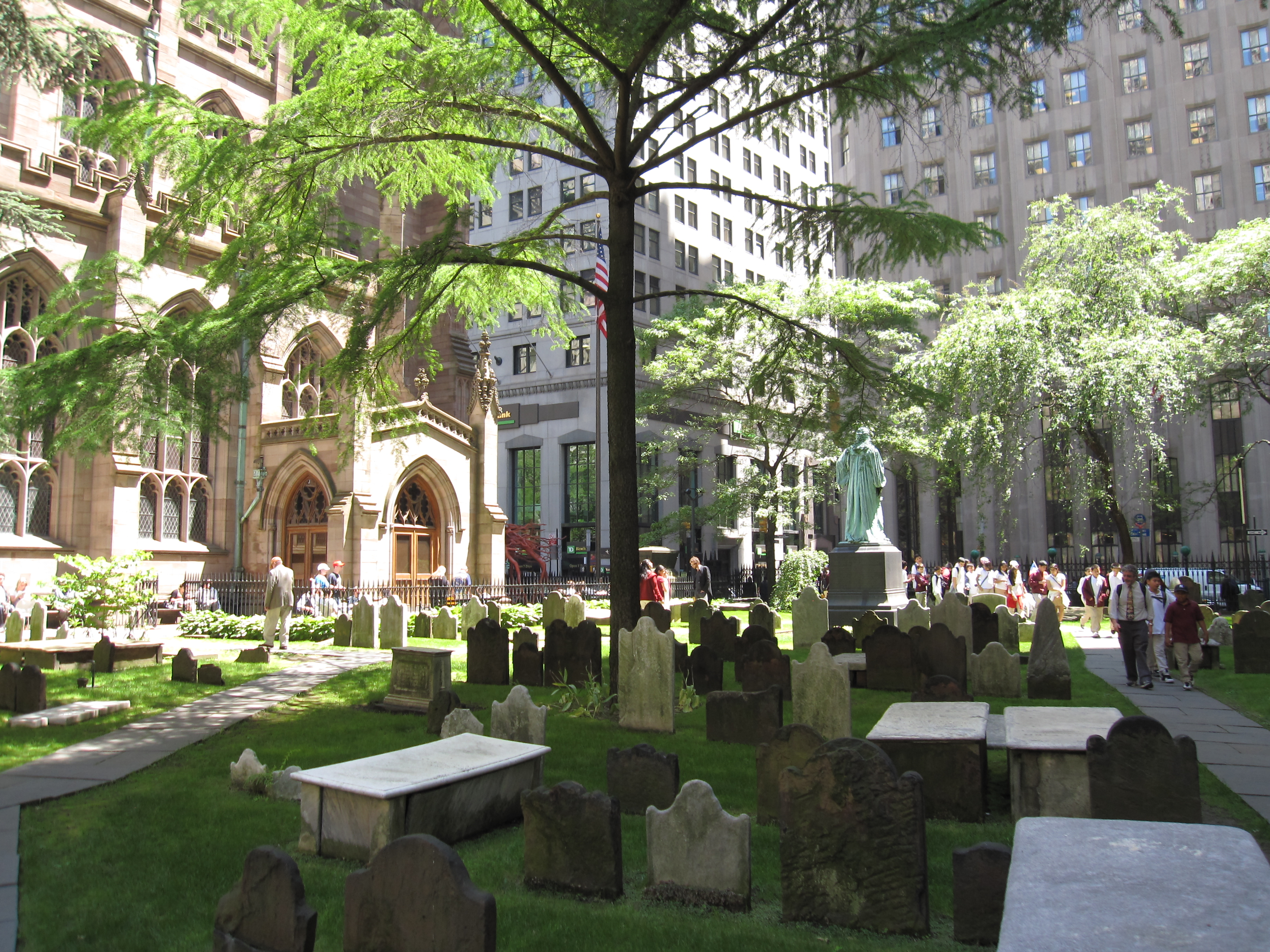
- Trinity Churchyard at Broadway and Wall Street
- Location: Trinity Church (shown): 74 Trinity Place; Trinity Church Cemetery and Mausoleum: 770 Riverside Drive; St. Paul's Chapel: 209 Broadway; Manhattan, New York, U.S.
- Coordinates: 40°42′30″N 74°00′42″W
- Built: 1697
- NRHP reference No.: 80002677 (Trinity Church Uptown Cemetery) (Note: St. Paul's Chapel (NRHP #66000551) and Trinity Church (NRHP #76001252), both National Historic Landmarks, are listed separately.)

Significant dates
- Added to NRHP: July 24, 1980 (Trinity Church Uptown Cemetery)
- Designated NYSRHP: June 23, 1980

The parish of Trinity Church has three separate burial grounds associated with it in the New York City borough of Manhattan. The first, Trinity Churchyard, is located in Lower Manhattan at 74 Trinity Place, near Wall Street and Broadway. Alexander Hamilton and his wife Elizabeth Schuyler Hamilton, Albert Gallatin, and Robert Fulton are buried in the downtown Trinity Churchyard.

The second Trinity parish burial ground is the St. Paul's Chapel Churchyard, which is also located in Lower Manhattan, six blocks (roughly 440 yards (400 m)) north of Trinity Church. It was established in 1766. Both of these churchyards are closed to new burials.

Trinity's third place of burial, Trinity Church Cemetery and Mausoleum, located in Hamilton Heights in Upper Manhattan, is one of the few active burial sites in Manhattan. Trinity Church Cemetery and Mausoleum is listed on the National Register of Historic Places and is the burial place of notable people including John James Audubon, John Jacob Astor IV, Mayor Edward I. Koch, Governor John Adams Dix, Ralph Ellison, and Eliza Jumel. In 1823, all burials south of Canal Street became forbidden by New York City due to city crowding, yellow fever, and other public health fears.

After considering locations in the Bronx and portions of the then-new Green-Wood Cemetery, in 1842 Trinity Parish purchased the plot of land now bordered by 153rd Street, 155th Street, Amsterdam Avenue, and Riverside Drive to establish the Trinity Church Cemetery and Mausoleum. The cemetery is located beside the Chapel of the Intercession that Audubon co-founded in 1846, but this chapel is no longer part of Trinity parish. James Renwick, Jr., is the architect of Trinity Church Cemetery and further updates were made by Calvert Vaux. The uptown cemetery is also the center of the Heritage Rose District of New York City.

A no-longer-extant Trinity Parish burial ground was the Old Saint John's Burying Ground for St. John's Chapel. This location is bounded by Hudson, Leroy and Clarkson streets near Hudson Square. It was in use from 1806 to 1852 with over 10,000 burials, mostly poor and young. In 1897, it was turned into St. John's Park, with most of the burials left in place. The park was later renamed Hudson Park, and is now James J. Walker Park. (This park is different from a separate St. John's Park, a former private park and residential block approximately one mile to the south that now serves as part of the Holland Tunnel access.)

== Notable burials ==
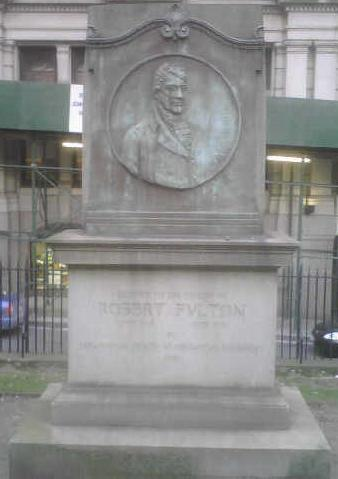
A cenotaph marker erected by the American Society of Mechanical Engineers honoring Robert Fulton at the Trinity Churchyard.

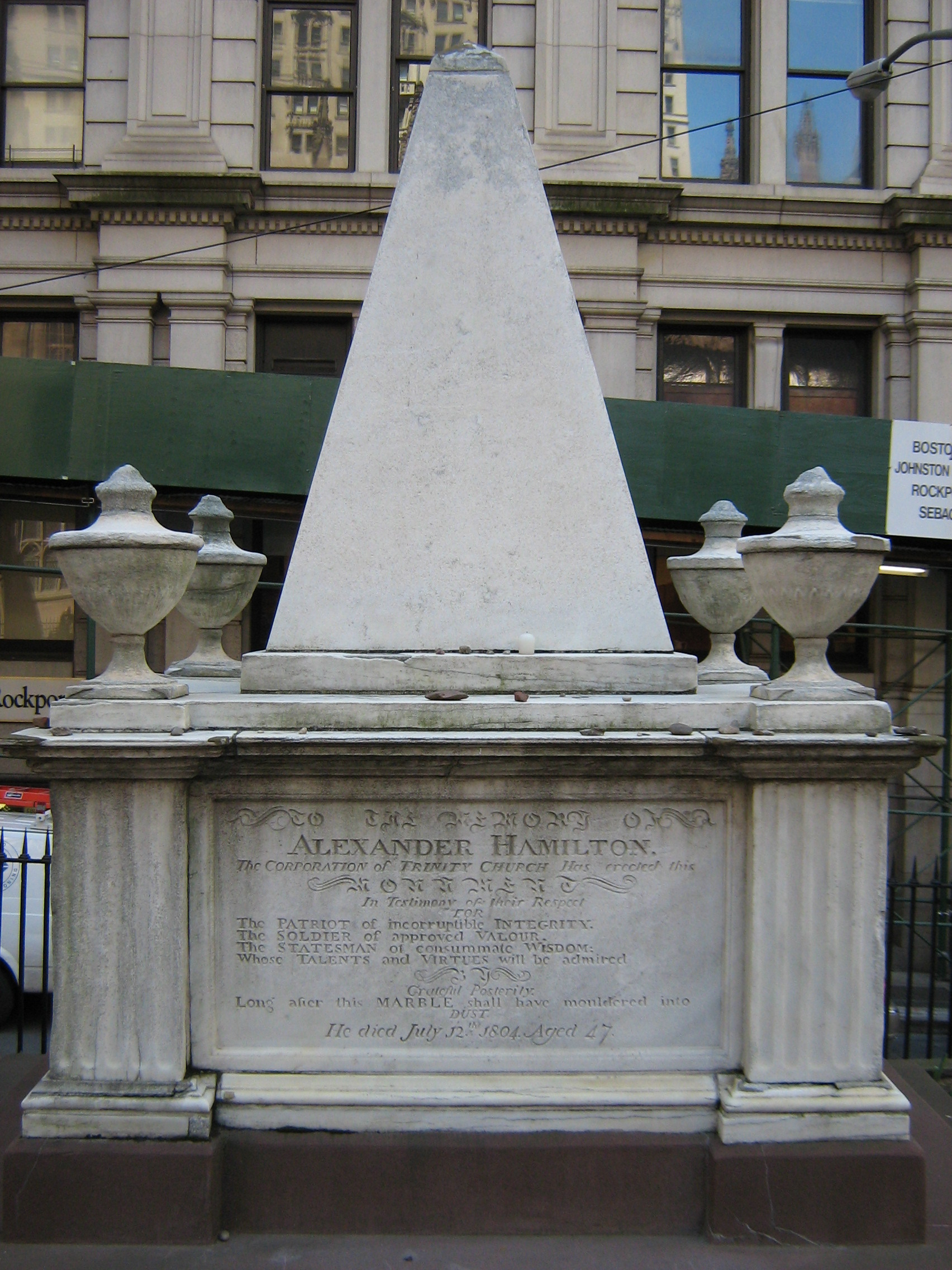
A gravemarker erected by the Corporation of Trinity Church for Alexander Hamilton.

=== Trinity Churchyard (Broadway and Wall Street) ===
- William Alexander, Lord Stirling (1726–1783), Continental Army major general during the American Revolution
- John Alsop (1724–1794), Continental Congress delegate
- Reverend Henry Barclay (1712–1764), rector of Trinity Church from 1742 to 1764
- William Bayard Jr. (1761–1826), banker
- William Berczy (1744–1813), Canadian painter and pioneer buried in unmarked grave and name recorded as William Burksay
- William Bradford (1660–1752), colonial American printer
- Richard Churcher (1676–1681), a child whose grave is marked with the oldest carved gravestone in New York City
- Angelica Schuyler Church (1756–1814), daughter of Philip Schuyler, sister of Elizabeth Schuyler Hamilton and Margarita Schuyler Van Rensselaer
- Michael Cresap (1742–1775), frontiersman
- James De Lancey (1703–1760), Colonial Governor of New York
- John R. Fellows (1832–1896), U.S. representative
- Robert Fulton (1765–1815), inventor of the first commercially successful steamboat
- Albert Gallatin (1761–1849), U.S. congressman, Secretary of the Treasury, founder of New York University
- Horatio Gates (1727–1806), Continental Army general during the American Revolution
- James Gordon (1735–1783), 80th Regiment of Foot (Royal Edinburgh Volunteers) Lieutenant Colonel
- Aaron Hackley, Jr. (1783–1868), U.S. representative
- Alexander Hamilton (1755/57–1804), American revolutionary patriot and Founding Father; first U.S. Secretary of the Treasury, and a signer of the United States Constitution, husband of Elizabeth Schuyler Hamilton
- Elizabeth Schuyler Hamilton (1757–1854), co-founder and deputy director of New York's first private orphanage, now Graham Windham
- Philip Hamilton (1782–1801), first son of Elizabeth Schuyler Hamilton and Alexander Hamilton, grandson of U.S. General Philip Schuyler, nephew of Angelica Schuyler Church and Margarita Schuyler Van Rensselaer
- John Sloss Hobart (1738–1805), U.S. senator
- William Hogan (1792–1874), U.S. congressman
- James Lawrence (1781–1813), naval hero during the War of 1812
- Francis Lewis (1713–1802), signer of the Declaration of Independence
- Walter Livingston (1740–1797), delegate to the Continental Congress
- Luther Martin (1744–1826), delegate to the Continental Congress
- Charles McKnight (1750–1791), Continental Army surgeon
- John Jordan Morgan (1770–1849), U.S. representative
- Hercules Mulligan (1740–1825), spy during the American Revolution, friend of Alexander Hamilton
- Thomas Jackson Oakley (1783–1857), U.S. representative
- John Morin Scott (1730–1784), Continental Congress delegate, Revolutionary War general, first secretary of state of New York
- George Templeton Strong (1820–1875), diarist, abolitionist, lawyer
- Robert Swartwout (1779–1848), brigadier general, Quartermaster general of the War of 1812
- Silas Talbot (1750–1813), U.S. Navy commodore, second captain of the USS Constitution
- John Watts (1749–1836), U.S. representative
- Franklin Wharton (1767–1818), Commandant of the Marine Corps, 1804–1818
- Hugh Williamson (1735–1802), American politician, signer of the Constitution of the United States
- John Peter Zenger (1697–1746), newspaper publisher whose libel trial helped establish the right to a free press

In the northeast corner stands the Soldiers' Monument, with a plaque reading: "At a meeting of Citizens held at the City Hall of the City of New York June 8, 1852: It was resolved That the Erection of a becoming Monument with appropriate inscriptions by Trinity Church to the Memory of those great and good Men who died whilst in Captivity in the old Sugar House and were interred in Trinity Church Yard in this City will be an act gratifying not only to the attendants of this Meeting but to Every American Citizen."

The claim those prisoners are buried in Trinity Churchyard is disputed by Charles I. Bushnell, who argued in 1863 that Trinity Church would not have accepted them because it supported Great Britain. Historian Edwin G. Burrows explains how the controversy related to a proposal to build a public street through the churchyard.

=== Trinity Church Cemetery and Mausoleum (770 Riverside Drive) ===
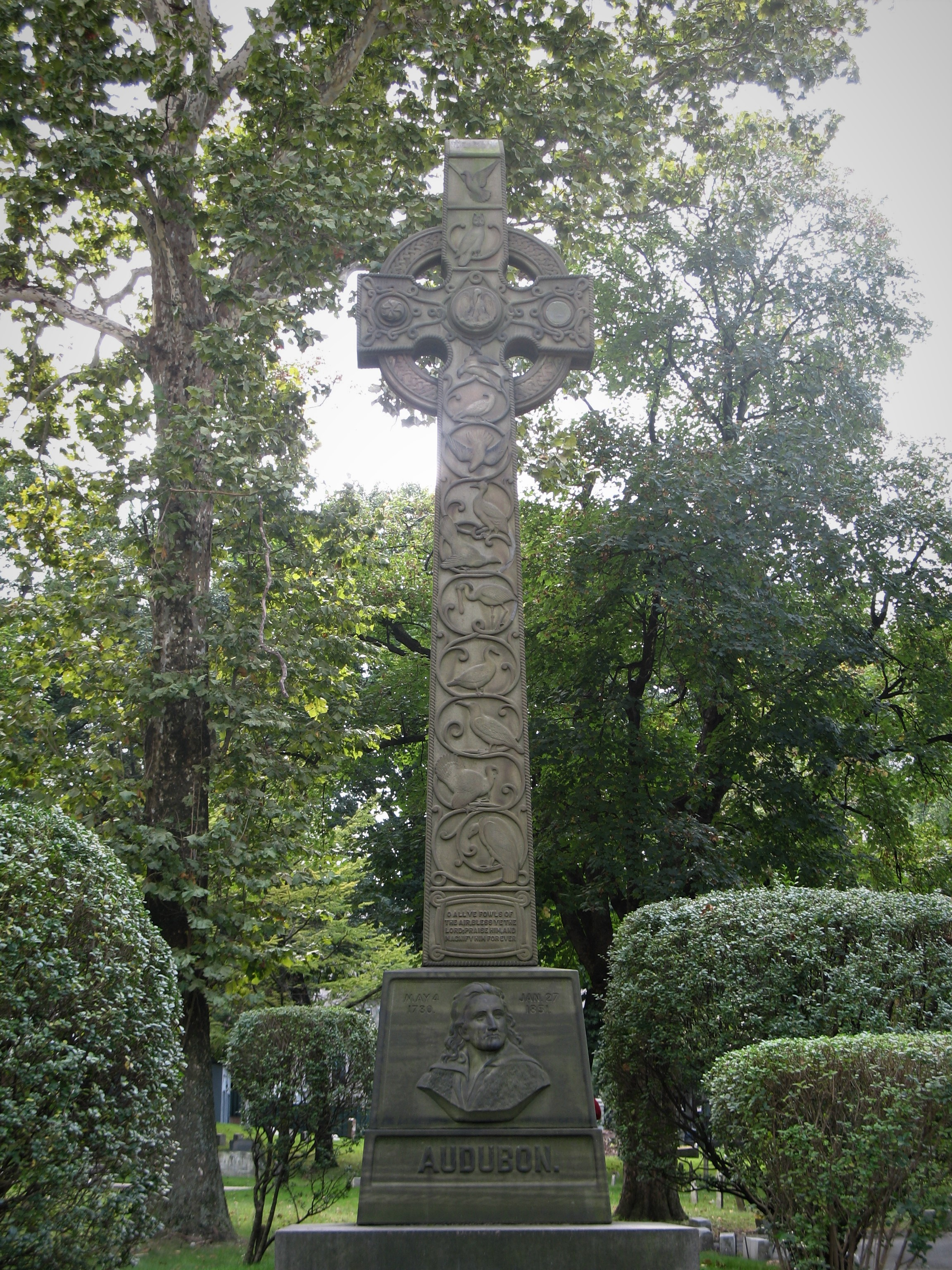
Cross erected in 1893 by the New York Academy of Sciences in honor of John James Audubon.

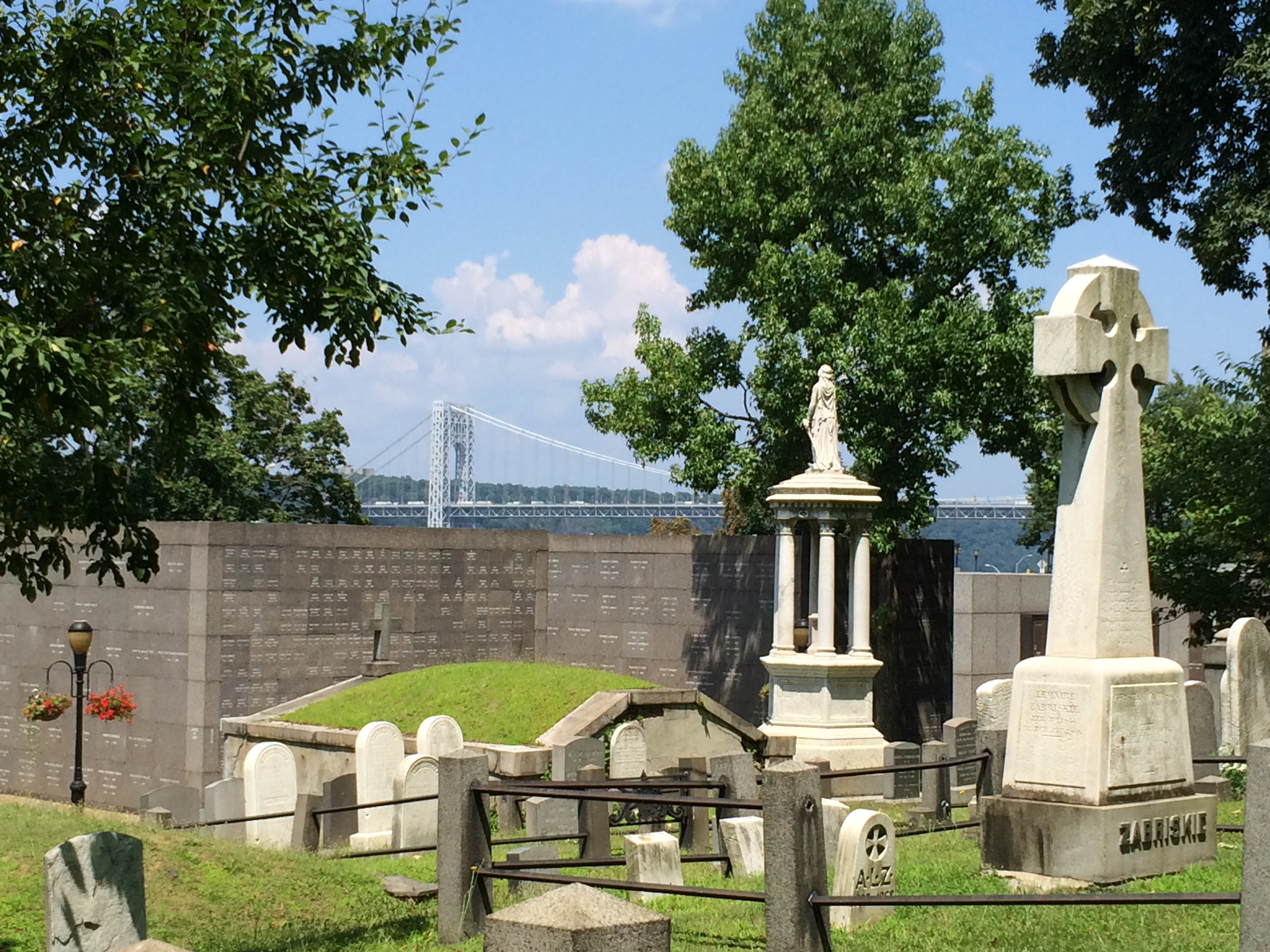
A present-day view of the cemetery with the George Washington Bridge visible in the background.

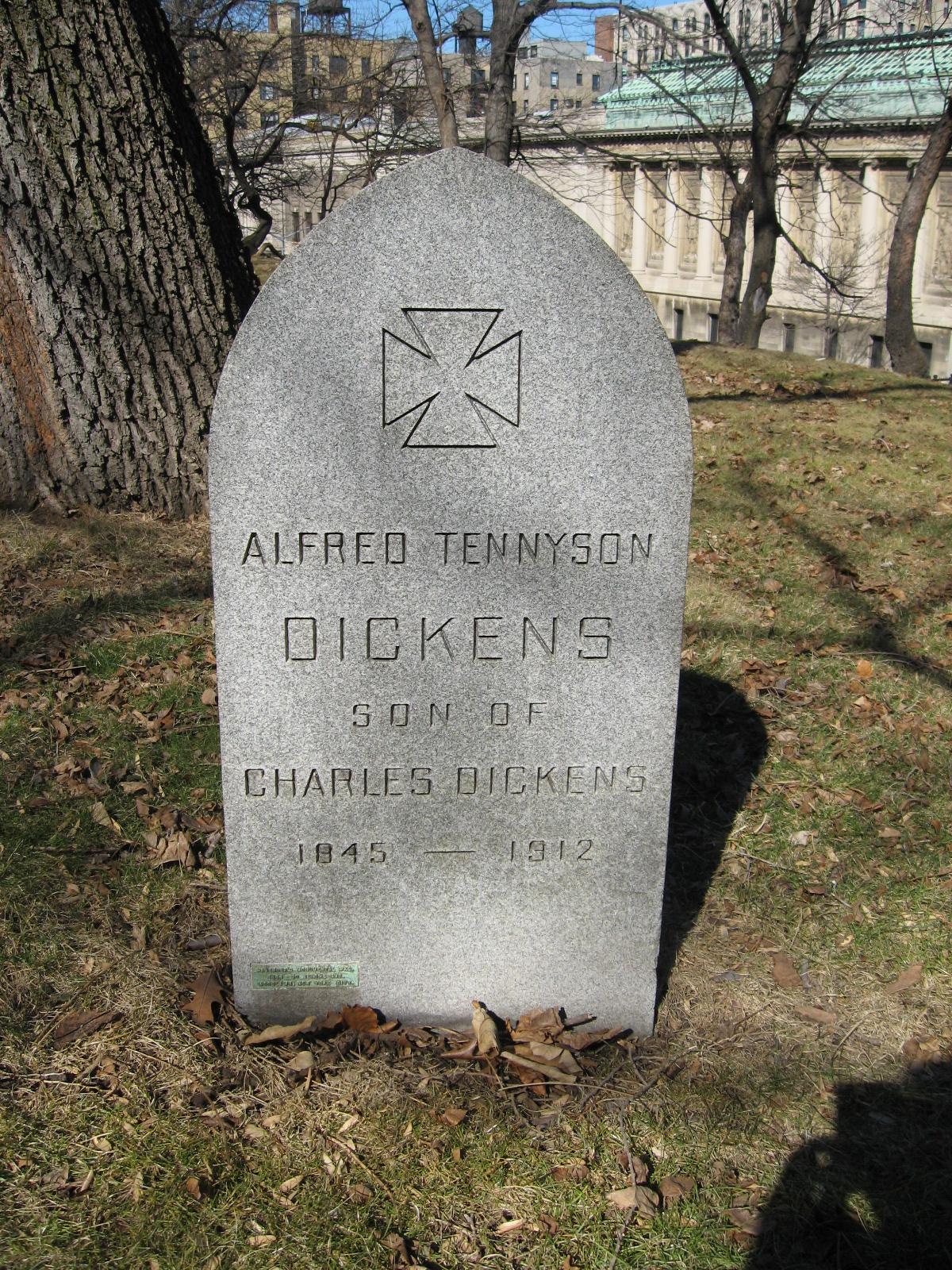
The grave of Alfred Dickens in Trinity Church Cemetery and Mausoleum

- Amsale Aberra (1954–2018), Ethiopian-American fashion designer and entrepreneur
- Mercedes de Acosta (1893–1968), writer, socialite
- Rita de Acosta Lydig (1876–1929), socialite
- Caroline Webster Schermerhorn Astor (1830–1908), socialite, doyenne of Gilded Age New York society
- John Jacob Astor (1763–1848) business magnate, progenitor of the Astor family of New York
- John Jacob Astor III (1822–1890), financier and philanthropist
- John Jacob Astor IV (1864–1912), millionaire killed in the sinking of the Titanic
- John Jacob Astor VI (1912–1992), shipping magnate
- William Backhouse Astor, Sr. (1792–1875), real estate businessman
- William Backhouse Astor, Jr. (1829–1892), businessman and race horse breeder/owner
- John James Audubon (1785–1851), ornithologist and naturalist
- Will Barnet (1911–2012), artist
- Estelle Bennett (1941–2009), member of the 1960s girl group The Ronettes
- John Romeyn Brodhead (1814–1873), historian of early colonial New York
- John J. Cisco (1806–1884), Assistant Treasurer of the United States under presidents Franklin Pierce, James Buchanan, and Abraham Lincoln
- John Winthrop Chanler (1826–1877), United States Congressman
- Robert Winthrop Chanler (1872–1930), muralist and designer
- William Astor Chanler (1867–1934), United States Congressman
- Cadwallader D. Colden (1769–1834), abolitionist (New York Manumission Society) (1806–1834); Mayor of New York City (1818–1821)
- William Augustus Darling (1817–1895), United States Congressman
- Alfred D'Orsay Tennyson Dickens (1845–1912), lecturer on the life of his father, Charles Dickens
- John Adams Dix (1798–1879), soldier, United States Senator, Secretary of the Treasury, Governor of New York, statesman
- Ralph Ellison, (1914–1994), novelist, critic, and educator, author of Invisible Man
- Henry Erben (1832–1909), rear admiral of the United States Navy, serving in the American Civil War and Spanish-American War
- Herman D. Farrell Jr. (1932–2018), New York State Assembly member
- Madeleine Talmage Force (1893–1940), socialite, Titanic survivor, second wife of John Jacob Astor IV
- Bertram Goodhue (1869–1924), American architect and typeface designer, designed the Rockefeller Chapel at the University of Chicago
- Cuba Gooding Sr. (1944–2017), singer and actor
- Edward Haight (1817–1885), United States Congressman
- Katherine Corri Harris (1890–1927), American silent film actor
- Abraham Oakey Hall (1826–1898), Mayor of New York City
- Anthony Philip Heinrich (1781–1861), American composer and founding chair of the New York Philharmonic Society
- Geoffrey Lamont Holder (1930–2014), Trinidadian-American actor, dancer, and choreographer, principal actor for the Metropolitan Opera Ballet in New York City, portrayed Baron Samedi in Live and Let Die
- David Hosack (1769–1835), physician, botanist, educator, tended to Alexander Hamilton's mortal wound
- Charles C. Ingham (1797–1863), Irish-American portraitist
- Eliza Jumel (1775–1865), second wife of Aaron Burr
- Dita Hopkins Kinney (1855–1921), first superintendent of United States Army Nurse Corps (1901–1909)
- Edward I. Koch (1924–2013), Mayor of New York City (1978–1989)
- John Lewis (1920–2001), American jazz pianist and founder of the Modern Jazz Quartet
- Robert O. Lowery (1916–2001), first African-American New York City Fire Commissioner (1966–1973)
- George Malloy (1920–2008), pianist, accompanied Camilla Williams singing "The Star-Spangled Banner", preceding Martin Luther King Jr. delivering his "I Have a Dream" speech, during the August 1963 March on Washington for Jobs and Freedom
- Robert Bowne Minturn (1805–1866), prominent New York merchant, philanthropist; shipper owner of Flying Cloud
- James Monroe (1799–1870), U.S. Congressman
- Clement Clarke Moore (1779–1863), clergyman, attributed author of Christmas poem A Visit from St. Nicholas
- Jerry Orbach (1935–2004), actor, singer
- Samuel B. Ruggles (1799–1881), politician, member of the New York State Assembly, donated land used to create Gramercy Park in New York City
- Francis Shubael Smith (1819–1887), co-founder of Street & Smith publishing
- Thomas Fielding Scott (1807–1867), first missionary Episcopal Bishop of Washington and Oregon
- Samuel Seabury (1873–1958), New York City judge, not to be confused with the known rival of Alexander Hamilton
- Frederick Clarke Withers (1828–1901), English-American architect in the High Victorian Gothic style
- Fernando Wood (1812–1881), Mayor of New York City

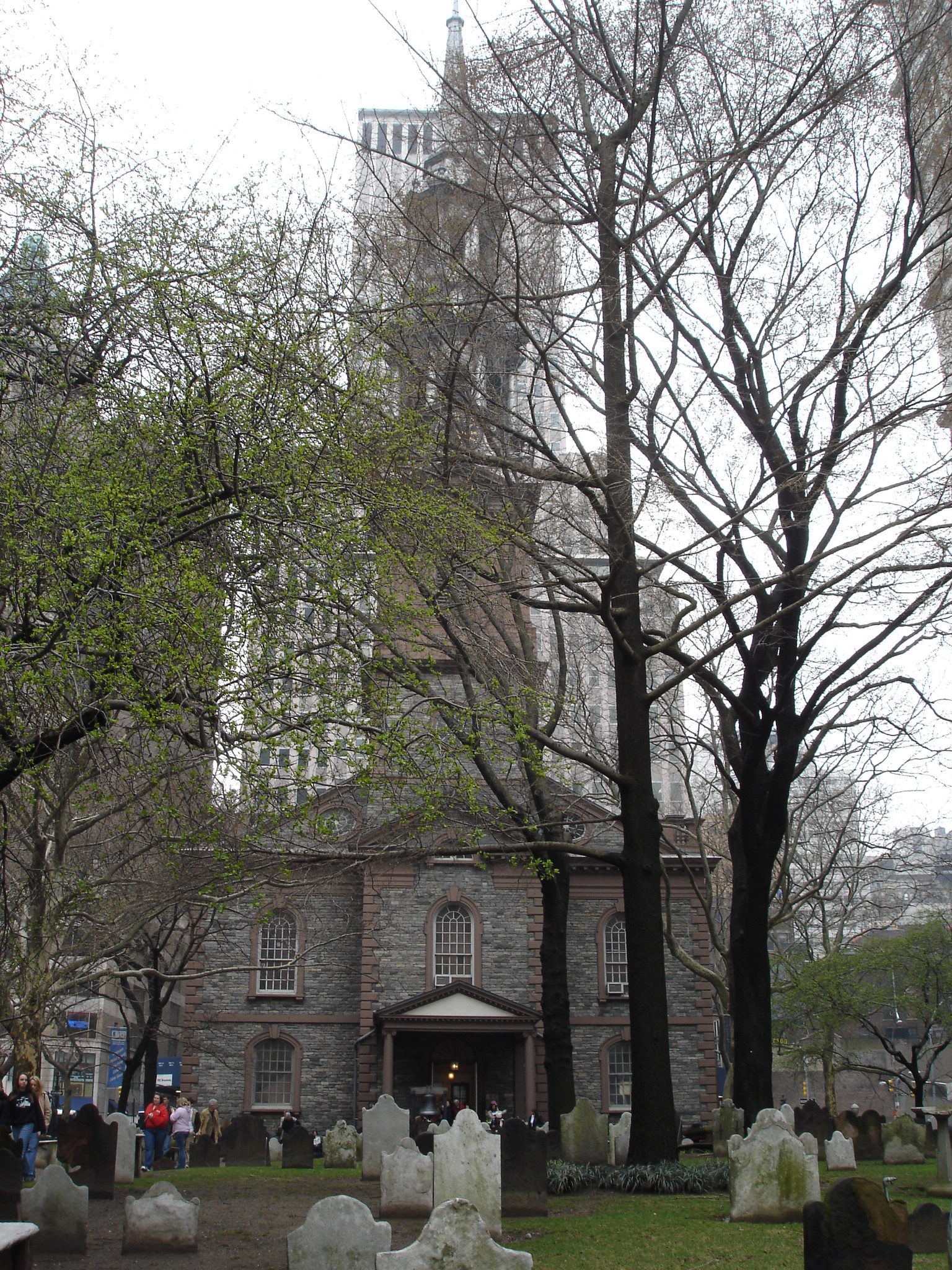
Gravestones in St. Paul's Chapel churchyard

=== St. Paul's Chapel Churchyard (Broadway at Fulton Street) ===
- George Frederick Cooke (1756–1812), actor
- Richard Coote, 1st Earl of Bellomont (1636–1701), British colonial governor
- John Holt (1721–1784), publisher
- William Houstoun (1755–1813), Continental Congress delegate for whom Houston Street was named
- Richard Montgomery (1738–1775) Major General in the Continental Army during the American Revolution
- Stephen Rochefontaine (1755–1814), Continental Army officer during the American Revolution
