= Eliza Jumel =

American socialite (1775-1865)

- Lithograph of Eliza Jumel, which she commissioned in 1852
- Born: Elizabeth Bowen; April 2, 1775; Providence, Rhode Island, British America
- Died: July 16, 1865 (aged 90); New York City, New York, U.S.
- Resting place: Trinity Church Cemetery
- Other name: Eliza Burr
- Spouses: Stephen Jumel (m. 1804; died 1832) Aaron Burr (m. 1833; div. 1836)

Eliza Jumel (née Bowen; April 2, 1775 – July 16, 1865), also known as Eliza Burr, was a wealthy American socialite. She was married to Aaron Burr and their divorce was finalized on the day of his death. Although she was born into poverty, an advantageous marriage to a wealthy merchant made her one of the richest women in New York at the time of her death.

== Early life ==
Eliza Jumel was born Elizabeth Bowen in Providence, Rhode Island, on April 2, 1775 (she would later joke "that she had come near being an April fool"). She had two older siblings, John (born 1769) and Mary, called Polly (born 1772). Jumel's mother, Phebe Kelley Bowen, worked from a young age as an indentured servant. Her father, John Bowen, was a sailor.

By the time Jumel was seven years old, she and her mother were living in a brothel along with five other women. By age 9, Jumel and her sister Polly were living in a workhouse, in 1784, because their parents were unable to support them. A year later, the sisters were again living with their mother in the house of Patience Ingraham, a widow who had previously been cited for "keeping a house of bad fame". Both Phebe Bowen and the widow Ingraham were arrested in 1785 "for keeping a disorderly house", and Jumel and her sister were again thrown in the workhouse. From there she was indentured to a sea captain and his family.

Jumel's father died in 1786, when she was eleven. Her mother remarried in 1790 to an itinerant cobbler named Jonathan Clark, and they moved from town to town in New England, and then finally to Williamston, North Carolina. There they both succumbed to yellow fever in 1798, victims of an epidemic that may have also taken the life of Jumel's older brother.

After her mother's and step-father's deaths, the 23 or 24 year old Jumel moved to New York, and changed her name to Eliza Brown. There she became an extra at a local theater, and during her early years in the city, she may have also found work as a domestic servant. Jumel's sister later joined her in New York, changing her name to Maria Bowne, and marrying a William Jones in 1805. In 1808, Maria (Polly) gave birth to a daughter who she named Eliza Jumel Jones in honor of her sister.

== Marriage to Stephen Jumel ==
Jumel met and, on April 9, 1804, married the wealthy French-Haitian merchant Stephen Jumel, 10 years her senior. Born Êtienne Jumel in France in 1765, her first husband grew up in a merchant family, emigrating to the American Colonies on the eve of the French Revolution and, like Jumel, changed his name to better fit his new life.

In 1807, Jumel became an Episcopalian and was baptized at Trinity Church in Manhattan, even though Stephen was a lifelong Catholic. Though she and her husband had no children of their own, they took in Mary Jones, the eldest and illegitimate daughter of her sister Polly (also called Maria), who was thus rechristened "Miss Jumel" and lived with the couple as their daughter.

In 1810, Stephen and Jumel moved to what became known as the Morris-Jumel Mansion in northern Manhattan, turning the home into their summer villa. Built in 1765 by Colonel Roger Morris for himself and his wife Mary Philipse, the daughter of Frederick Philipse II, the house became George Washington's headquarters for several months in 1776 after the Morrises, who were Tory sympathizers, had fled back to England. Though it was from these headquarters that General Washington won his first victory of the war, the Battle of Harlem Heights, he and his troops soon retreated, and the mansion was taken over by Hessian soldiers, then confiscated after the war came to an end.

== Time in Paris ==
In 1815, Jumel and Stephen traveled to Paris, where they were linked to Bonapartist sympathizers. Jumel owned several relics from Josephine Bonaparte's extended family and claimed a close relationship with Bonaparte. It is now believed, however, that the Jumels had only a distant acquaintance with the Bonapartes, and that they bought most of the Napoleonic items at auction in Paris.

Jumel had taken lessons with a French tutor during her courtship with Stephen, and she and Stephen easily conversed in both French and English (though Jumel never became totally fluent). Despite later accounts of an acrimonious marriage, their personal letters show them to have been an affectionate couple throughout their union, although letters on both sides were occasionally marked by fears of abandonment.

Either illness or controversial political opinions led to Jumel leaving France in 1816. She returned to her home in New York, while Stephen Jumel remained in France. Stephen saw his fortunes decline during a series of economic depressions, leading to the collapse of his merchant trade in Paris. Jumel, however, managed their American estate and holdings with a good business acumen, and proved an astute investor. She made herself unpopular as a businesswoman in New York, however. Several of Stephen's business acquaintances had been dishonest with his finances during the couple's absence, and it became Jumel's task to both make accusations and recoup money lost so that through her initiative, the couples' finances were saved from ruin. The couple continued to travel between New York, Paris, and Stephen's family home in Bordeaux. During these travels, Jumel amassed a large and respected art collection, considered the first substantial collection of European art in North America.

== Marriage to Aaron Burr ==
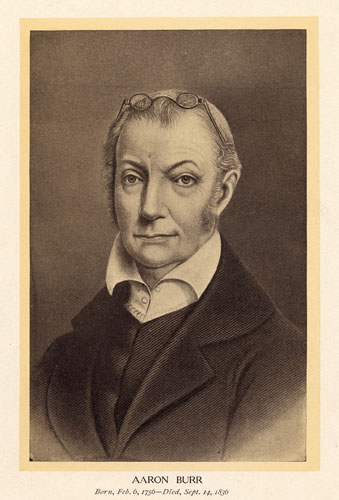
Aaron Burr

Stephen Jumel died in 1832 (age 67) when he accidentally fell off a hay wagon onto his pitchfork.

Fourteen months after his death, the 58-year-old Eliza Jumel married the 76-year-old former United States Vice President Aaron Burr. She may have married Burr to increase her stature, while Burr may have wanted access to her fortune. Burr mismanaged the liquid assets remaining in the Jumel fortune, and the two separated only four months after their marriage. Jumel's prudence in real estate management, however, allowed her to remain financially solvent. Their divorce was finalized on September 14, 1836, the day of Burr's death. The apocryphal story is that she was represented by Alexander Hamilton, Jr., the son of Alexander Hamilton, whom Burr shot and killed in a duel years earlier.

== Later life ==
Jumel continued to travel throughout Europe and to the summer retreats of New York for twenty years.

Anne Northup, a noted chef and wife of Solomon Northup, lived and worked at Jumel's mansion for two years with her daughter Elizabeth and son Alonzo when her husband was kidnapped and enslaved in 1841.

In her last significant travels, Jumel accompanied her two adopted grandchildren on a Grand Tour of Europe in 1856, during which time a large, life-size oil portrait of the three was executed by Alcide Ercole.

As symptoms of dementia took their toll on Jumel's memory and behavior, stories about her eccentricity spread through New York and Saratoga Springs. Apocryphal stories from the 1880s suggests that Eliza may have become a regular target of mockery in Saratoga Springs. Jumel remained at her Manhattan mansion for the last six years of her life, dying there at age 90 in 1865. She was buried in Manhattan at the Trinity Church Cemetery and Mausoleum.

== Additional Sources ==
Numerous books have been written about Eliza Jumel, some as far back as the turn of the century, including the following:

- The Remarkable Rise of Eliza Jumel: A Story of Marriage and Money in the Early Republic by Margaret A. Oppenheimer
- Pickles and Honey: Ruby's Song by John D. Lowe
- Eliza Jumel Burr: Vice Queen of the United States by Diana Rubino
- Painted Lady, Eliza Jumel: Her Life and Times by Leonard Falkner
- Notorious Eliza by Basil Beyea
- The Amazing Madame Jumel by William Cary Duncan
- Madame Jumel by Pauline Panzer
- The Jumel Mansion by William Henry Shelton
