= The Hermitage (Ho-Ho-Kus, New Jersey) =

Historic house in New Jersey, United States

- U.S. National Register of Historic Places
- U.S. National Historic Landmark
- New Jersey Register of Historic Places
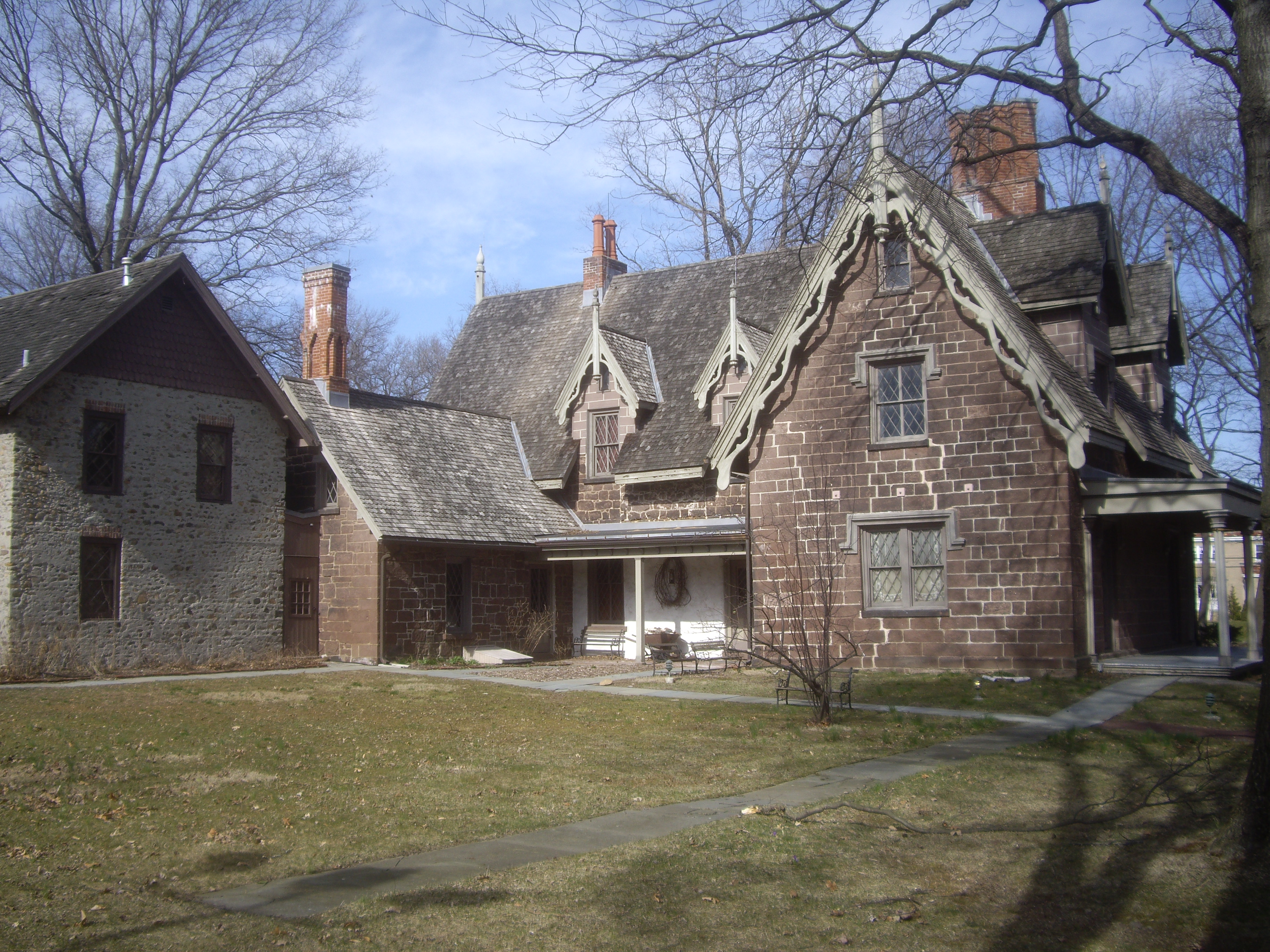

- Location within Bergen County, New Jersey Location within New Jersey Location within the United States
- Location: 335 North Franklin Turnpike, Ho-Ho-Kus, NJ 07423
- Coordinates: 41°0′24″N 74°7′10″W
- Area: 4.9 acres (2.0 ha)
- Built: c.1750; renovated 1847
- Architect: William H. Ranlett
- Architectural style: Gothic Revival
- NRHP reference No.: 70000379
- NJRHP No.: 540

Significant dates
- Added to NRHP: August 29, 1970
- Designated NHL: May 22, 1970
- Designated NJRHP: May 27, 1971

The Hermitage, located in Ho-Ho-Kus, Bergen County, in the U.S. state of New Jersey, is a fourteen-room Gothic Revival house museum built in 1847–48 from designs by William H. Ranlett for Elijah Rosencrantz, Jr. Members of the Rosencrantz family owned The Hermitage estate from 1807 to 1970. The site was designated a National Historic Landmark for the excellence of its architecture and added to National Register of Historic Places in 1970 and was added to the New Jersey Register of Historic Places in 1971.

== History ==
In 1767, the original colonial estate was purchased by Ann Bartow DeVisme who moved to Ho-Ho-Kus from Manhattan with five children. One of Ann's daughters, Theodosia Bartow Prevost, and her husband James Marcus Prevost, occupied another house on the property, downhill from the present structure, nearer to the mill ponds. During the American Revolutionary War, while Major (later Lieutenant Colonel) Prevost was fighting for the British in Georgia and South Carolina, the women and children were left alone in Ho-Ho-Kus.

In July 1778, word reached Theodosia that George Washington and his troops would be passing through Ho-Ho-Kus on their way from the recent battle at Monmouth Courthouse to White Plains in Westchester County, New York. When the General and his entourage stopped at a local house, Theodosia sent an invitation to Washington for him and his men to come and stay at The Hermitage.

Visitors to the house during the Revolution included James Monroe, William Paterson, the Marquis de Lafayette, Alexander Hamilton, Lord Stirling and Aaron Burr. In 1782, after her husband was killed during the War, Theodosia Prevost married Aaron Burr at The Hermitage. For a period of time they lived in a small house adjacent to The Hermitage.

== Infrastructure ==
In 1847, the house, which was originally built in a Dutch American tradition, was remodeled in the Gothic Revival style by architect William H. Ranlett.

The large house which had a large cedar barn, consisted of wood-shingled roofs and pointed gables, allowing the classical music that played to be enjoyed along with the beautiful architecture.

The Hermitage is owned by the State of New Jersey and is a museum, open to the public year-round, financed and operated by The Friends of the Hermitage, Inc., a non-profit organization. The home and land were willed by Mary Elizabeth to the State of New Jersey.

Today, The Hermitage represents Bergen County's first National Historical Landmark.

== See also ==
- National Register of Historic Places listings in Bergen County, New Jersey
- List of museums in New Jersey
