= Joseph Alston =

American politician and Governor of South Carolina (1779–1816)

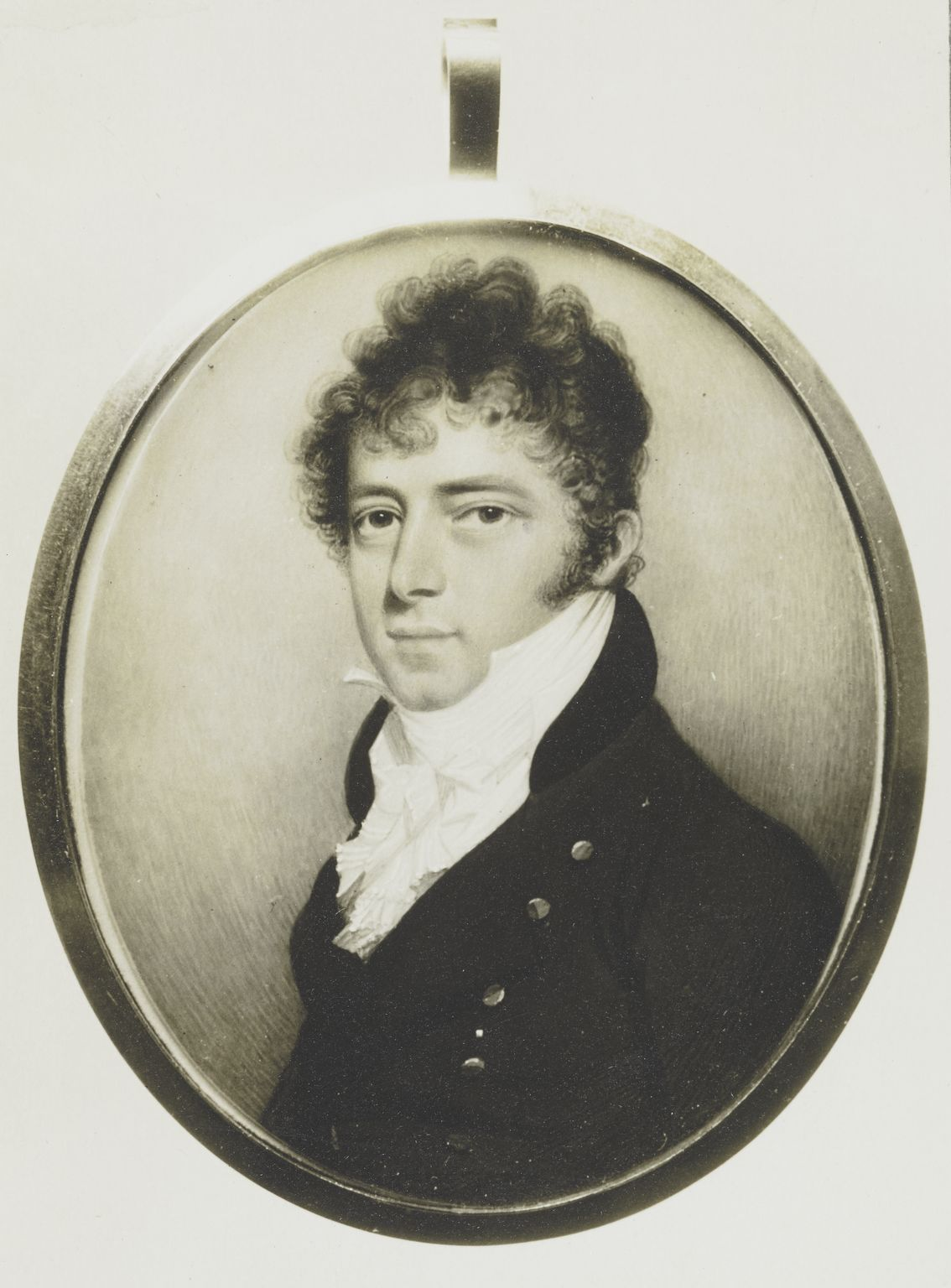
- Joseph Alston, Governor of South Carolina

44th Governor of South Carolina
- In office December 1, 1812 – December 1, 1814
- Lieutenant: Eldred Simkins
- Preceded by: Henry Middleton
- Succeeded by: David Rogerson Williams

15th Speaker of the South Carolina House of Representatives
- In office November 28, 1809 – November 23, 1812
- Governor: John Drayton; Henry Middleton
- Preceded by: Theodore Gaillard
- Succeeded by: John Geddes
- In office 1805 – November 28, 1808
- Governor: Paul Hamilton; Charles Pinckney
- Preceded by: William C. Pinckney
- Succeeded by: Theodore Gaillard

Member of the South Carolina House of Representatives from Georgetown Parish
- In office November 20, 1805 – December 10, 1812

Member of the South Carolina House of Representatives from Christ Church Parish
- In office November 22, 1802 – November 26, 1804

Personal details
- Born: January 4, 1779 All Saints' Waccamaw Parish, Pawleys Island, South Carolina, U.S.
- Died: September 10, 1816 (aged 37) Charleston, South Carolina, U.S.
- Party: Democratic-Republican
- Spouse: Theodosia Burr (m. 1801; died 1813)
- Children: 1

Joseph Alston (January 4, 1779– September 10, 1816) was the 44th governor of South Carolina from 1812 to 1814.

== Early life and career ==
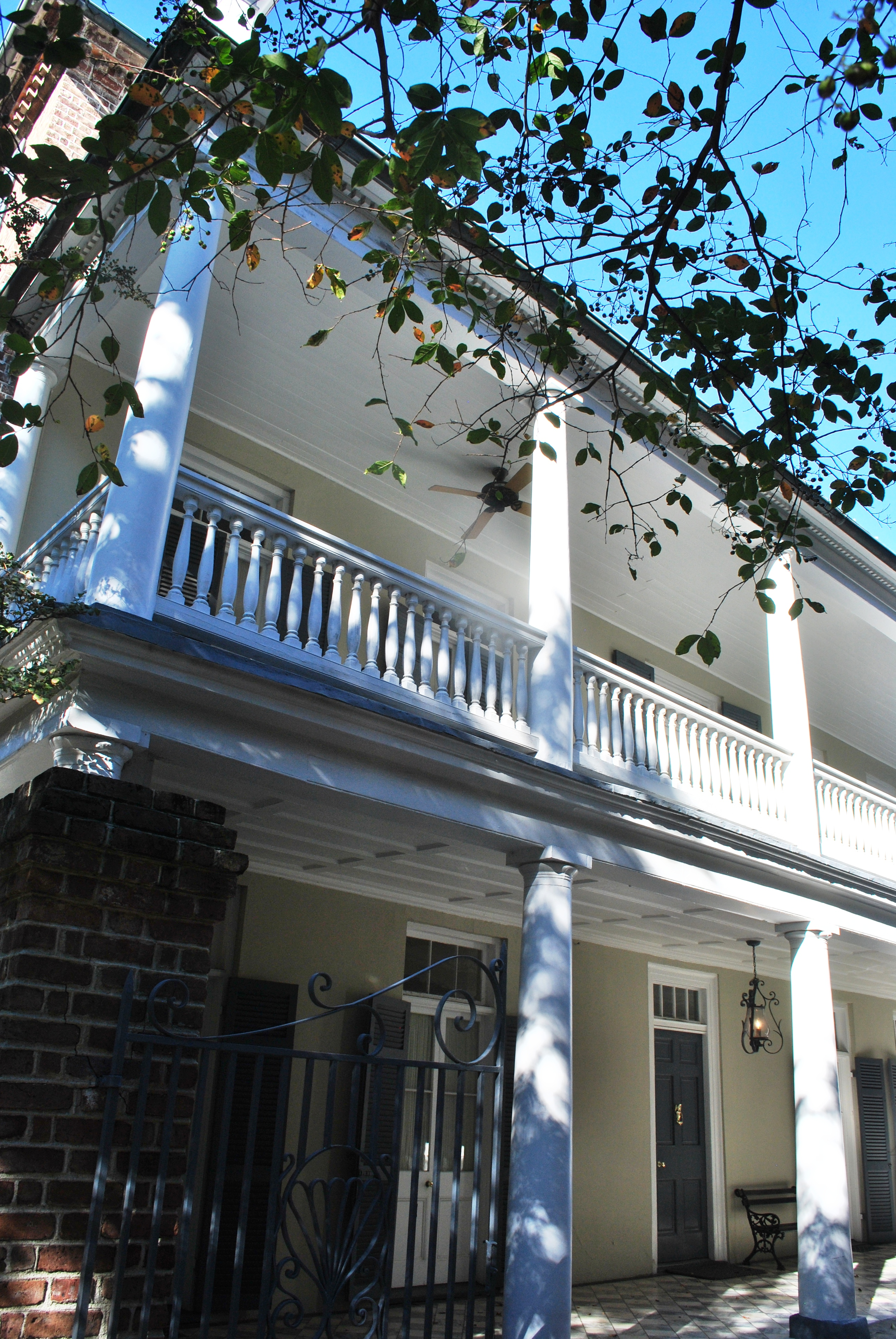
Thomas Bee's House, ca. 1730. A later owner was governor Joseph Alston and his wife Theodosia, daughter of Aaron Burr.

The son of William Alston, he was born in All Saints' Waccamaw Parish in Pawleys Island, South Carolina. Alston attended the College of New Jersey; but he left in 1796 without graduating. He then went to study law at the office of Edward Rutledge and was admitted to the bar. Alston decided against practicing law and instead engaged in planting, becoming one of the wealthiest planters in South Carolina.

In 1801, he married the daughter of Aaron Burr, Theodosia Burr Alston, partly to ingratiate himself with Republican voters in an effort to downplay his aristocratic status. The couple's honeymoon was spent in Niagara Falls, the first recorded couple to do so. Their son Aaron Burr Alston, born 1802, died in 1812.

== Political career ==
=== Rise to governor ===
Alston won election to the South Carolina House of Representatives for an 1802–1803 term and later for a more extended period, 1805 to 1812. In 1805, the House of Representatives chose Alston to be the Speaker, and he pushed the legislature to adopt a more equitable basis of representation.

Alston was implicated in the Burr conspiracy by Burr's correspondence (which is considered unreliable since had been altered by James Wilkinson), a journal entry of Harman Blannerhasset, and testimony of William Eaton, and others.

In 1812, the General Assembly elected Alston to be the Governor of South Carolina for a two-year term, after the removal of Thomas Sumter and Andrew Pickens as candidates. Alston's private life suffered tragedy by the loss of his wife and only child and the disappearance of a ship headed towards New York City which his wife had boarded. His troubles continued as his tenure got off to a rocky start and his popularity plummeted.

=== War of 1812 ===
With the War of 1812 raging, Governor Alston called the state militia into service in 1813, to protect military magazines from the British. Some soldiers of the militia refused to serve, and Alston issued a statement that the refusal of service would result in a death sentence. However, a court issued a writ of habeas corpus, and the men who had been charged with courts-martial were released.

Subsequently, Alston dismissed the entire militia from service; but the residents were in shock that their state was then completely defenseless from British attack. The Governor was forced to recall the militia into service after British forces landed on St. Helena Island, and the South Carolina General Assembly correspondingly increased the powers of the governor for the use of the militia in wartime.

== Later life ==
Alston left the governorship in 1814. He died in Charleston on September 10, 1816.

Political offices
Preceded by Henry Middleton	Governor of South Carolina; 1812–1814	Succeeded by David Rogerson Williams
Preceded by William C. Pinckney	Speaker of the South Carolina House of Representatives; 1805–1810	Succeeded by John Geddes
