= Theodosia Bartow Prevost =

American Revolution patriot (1746–1794)

Theodosia Bartow Burr
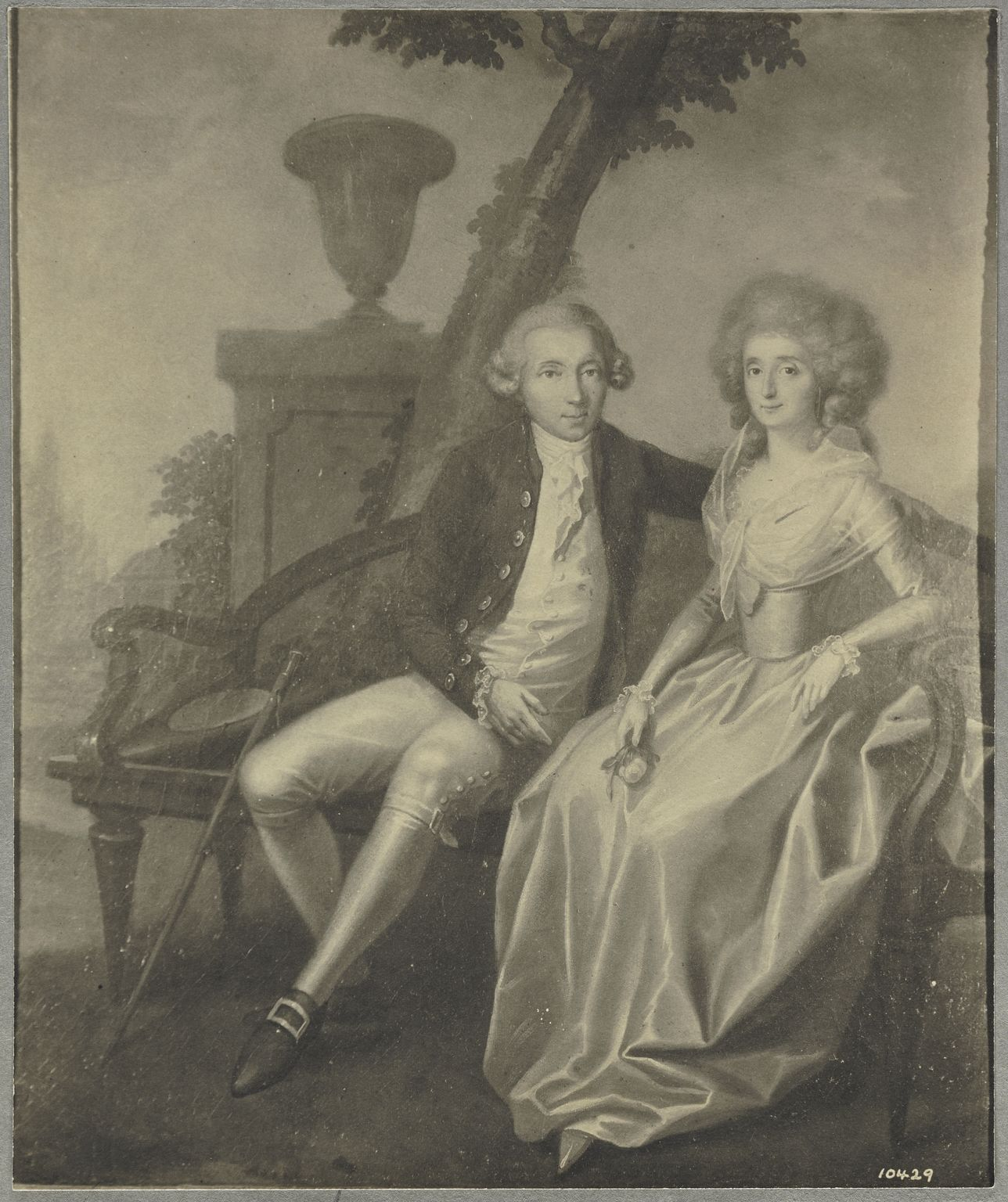
- Theodosia Bartow and her husband Aaron Burr, portrait by Henry Benbridge
- Born: Theodosia Bartow; November 1746; Shrewsbury Township, New Jersey
- Died: May 18, 1794 (aged 47); New York City
- Resting place: St. John's Burying Ground, New York
- Other name: Theodosia Bartow Burr
- Known for: American Revolution Patriot
- Spouses: Jacques Marcus Prevost (m. 1763; died 1781) Aaron Burr (m. 1782)
- Children: 7 or more, including John Bartow Prevost and Theodosia Burr Alston
- Parent(s): Ann Sands Stillwell; Theodosius Bartow

Theodosia Bartow Burr (née Bartow, formerly Bartow Prevost; November 1746 – May 18, 1794) was an American Patriot. Raised by a widowed mother, she married British Army officer Jacques Marcus Prevost at age 17. After the American Revolution began, her own Patriot leanings led her to offer the use of her house, the Hermitage, as a meeting- and resting-place for revolutionaries, including Alexander Hamilton, Marquis de Lafayette, and Aaron Burr; it was briefly used as the headquarters of George Washington, who counted her amongst his friends. Burr's visit to the Hermitage began a secret romance that, following the death of Prevost's first husband, led to marriage.

The couple relocated to New York City to support Burr's legal career, where she became an important ally during his entry into politics. She was known for her wit, unusually deep education and intellectual acuity. Her death in 1794 left Burr without "his best ally in the political wars to come".

== Early life ==
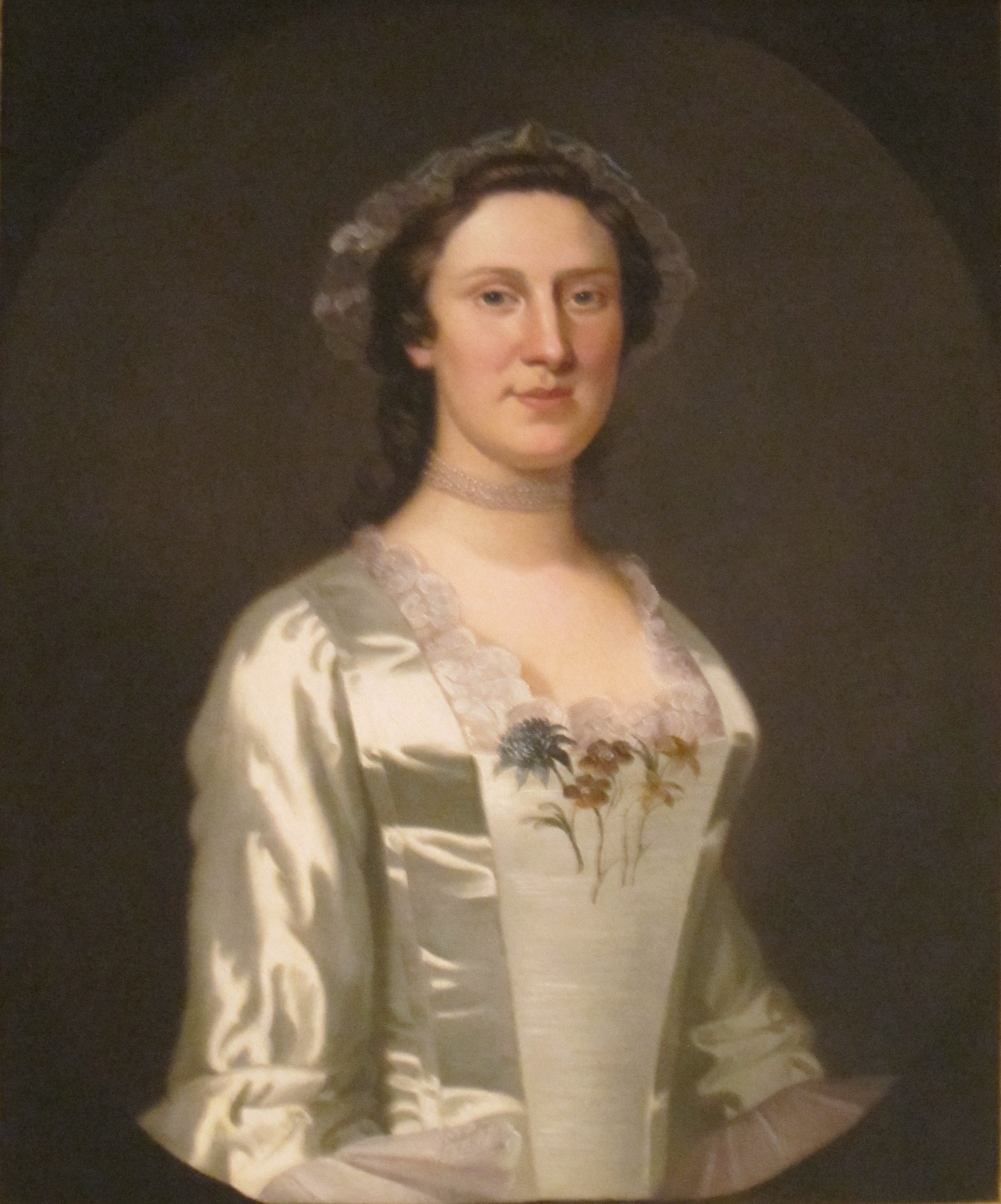
Theodosia's mother, Ann de Visme

Theodosia was born in November 1746 to Ann Sands Stillwell (1714–1782) and Theodosius Bartow (1712–1746), an attorney, in Shrewsbury Township, New Jersey. Her mother's family was noted for their beauty and had lived in America since 1638; her father's family had arrived in 1702 when John Bartow was sent to establish a Church of England ministry in Westchester County, New York. Theodosius died on October 5, 1746, several weeks before Theodosia was born. Five years later, Theodosia's mother married Philip de Visme, a captain in the British Army, with whom she had five more children.

De Visme provided for Theodosia's tutoring, ensuring that she received a "cosmopolitan education" and became fluent in French. She would later translate French political treatises to English, and exchanged informed political observations and arguments as equals with Burr in their correspondence.

At the age of seventeen, Theodosia married Jacques Marcus Prevost (1736–1781), a Swiss native and the brother of Augustine Prevost (1723–1786), who was serving as commander of the British Army forces in New Jersey. They married in Trinity Church in 1763. They had five children: Sally (1769–1815), Anna Louisa (1770–1815), Mary Louisa (born 1771), Augustine (1765–1842), and John (1766–1825). When Prevost was dispatched to the West Indies in the early 1770s, Theodosia and the children remained in New Jersey.

== Revolutionary War ==
Despite her family's background (both her stepfather and husband were officers of the Royal American Regiment) Theodosia aligned herself with the Patriots, counting William Livingston and Robert Troup as friends and allies. During the Revolution Theodosia's home, the Hermitage – named after the cottage of Jean-Jacques Rousseau – became a gathering-place for American soldiers. When she heard that George Washington was in the area following the Battle of Monmouth she extended an invitation for him to stay there. He accepted this invitation in July 1778, and briefly utilized the Hermitage as his headquarters. The home and its culture were "decidedly French" due to Theodosia's background, and she was known for the intelligent conversation akin to the debates common in French salons. Other visitors included generals Charles Lee and Jeremiah Wadsworth.

During the war, with her estate being owned by her husband, it was at various times under risk of confiscation as Loyalist property; her powerful friends, allies and patrons, including Livingston and William Paterson, ensured the case was halted.

Theodosia first met Aaron Burr in July 1778 when he accompanied George Washington to her home after the Battle of Monmouth. The two became friends and Burr began regularly visiting Theodosia's home in New Jersey. By November 1778 he was writing to his sister to speak of Theodosia's "honest and affectionate heart" and their regular conversations; his constant visits to the Hermitage provoked gossip, with Paterson baldly referring to Theodosia as "the object of [Burr's] Affections". The two fell in love, and by 1780 were openly lovers. In December 1781, Theodosia discovered her husband had died of yellow fever.

Theodosia and Burr's writings to each other covered politics, philosophy and feminism, with the two discussing both Rousseau and British feminist Mary Wollstonecraft; before the couple was exposed to the latter's Vindication of Rights of Women, Theodosia had criticized the former's Emile, or On Education not extending its theories of education to all sexes (similar to what Wollstonecraft would later argue) They modelled their relationship on a "mature affection", rather than the standard practice of marriages and relationships being based on social standing and convenience rather than love; this appealed to Theodosia's sense of independence and intellectual freedom. After Burr became licensed as an attorney, Theodosia and he married on July 2, 1782, at the Hermitage, with Livingston personally issuing the license. Their first child, and the only one to survive to adulthood, was born on June 21, 1783, and named Theodosia after her mother.

== Later life and death ==
The Burrs moved to New York City in 1783, moving to Broadway in 1790 as Aaron's legal career took off. This increase in work led to him travelling more, but their "intellectual partnership" did not suffer: the two wrote letters back and forth notable for their candor, with Theodosia constantly disagreeing with her husband's views, "never shy to point out his flaws", and Aaron treating her as he would any other intelligent person, sending her political books and newspapers on a regular basis that he thought she would enjoy. Theodosia's keen sense of observation and adeptness at "judging [Aaron's] peers on the national scene" made her a crucial ally in his political career, particularly after he joined the United States Senate in 1791.

Both Theodosia and Aaron had a "passionate commitment to education", and Theodosia educated her daughter as any wealthy male child would have been: she could read and write at three, studied Latin, Greek and French, and had read Gibbon's Decline and Fall of the Roman Empire by age 10. Aaron handled more and more of this as Theodosia's health began to deteriorate. Her illness was not a shock – she had been ill as long as they had known each other – but by 1792 she was in regular pain, with doctors' prescriptions doing little to help. Aaron offered to resign from the Senate to spend more time with her, but she refused to allow it. She died on May 18, 1794, at the age of 47. She was buried in the now defunct St. John's Burying Ground, which was associated with Trinity Church. Aaron later wrote that she was "the best woman and finest lady" he had ever known.

== In popular culture ==
While not a character, Theodosia is mentioned by name in the musical Hamilton, and is mentioned in the songs "The Story of Tonight (Reprise)" and "Wait For It". Another song, "Dear Theodosia (Reprise)" was written for the musical, in which Aaron Burr tells his daughter of Theodosia's death. This song was cut before the musical transferred to Broadway; however, in 2018 a cover was released by Sara Bareilles as part of the Hamildrops series of singles.

== Bibliography ==
- Brands, H.W. (2012). The Heartbreak of Aaron Burr. Anchor Books. ISBN 978-0-307-74326-8.
- Isenberg, Nancy (2007). Fallen Founder: The Life of Aaron Burr. Penguin Books. ISBN 978-0-14-311371-3.
- Lomask, Milton (1979). Aaron Burr: The Years from Princeton to Vice President, 1756–1805. Farrar, Straus & Giroux. ISBN 0-374-10016-0.
