= St. John's Burying Ground =

Cemetery in Manhattan (1834–1898)

Coordinates: 40.729820°N 74.006395°W

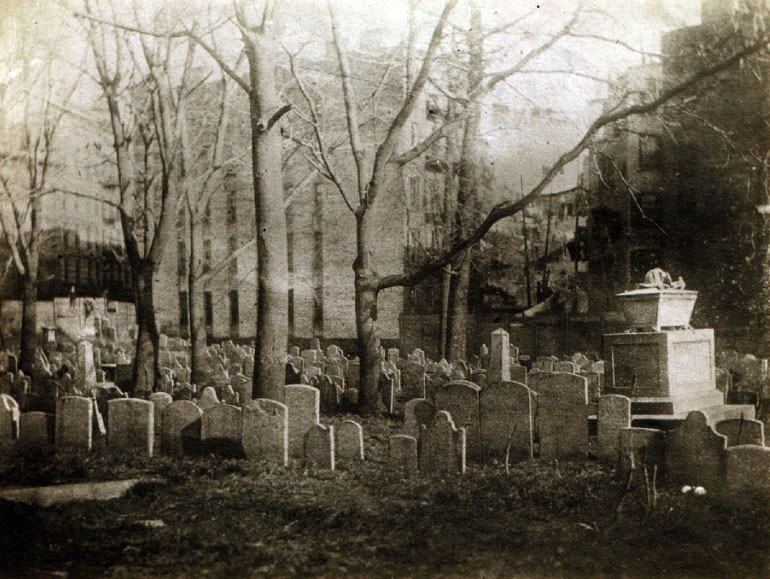
St. John's Burying Ground c. 1895

St. John's Burying Ground was a cemetery bounded by Varick Street, Leroy Street, Hudson Street and Clarkson Street in the Greenwich Village neighborhood of Lower Manhattan. The ground was connected with St. John's Chapel of Trinity Parish from 1834 to 1898, although many of the burials predate the cemetery's acquisition by the church. The last burials were in about 1860. It is estimated that about 10,000 people were buried there.

In 1897, the cemetery was made into a public park by the city of New York. Only about 250 bodies were removed. The new park was called St. John's Park, but later became known as Hudson Park, and is now called James J. Walker Park. Tony Dapolito Outdoor Pool and Community Center and Hudson Park Library were built on the old cemetery grounds.

The only remnant that remains of the park's time as a cemetery is the firemen's monument, which was erected by Engine Company 13 to Eugene Underhill and Frederick A. Ward, who were killed at a fire in 1834. The monument used to be at their grave site, but it was moved in 1898.

== Notable burials ==
- Theodosia Bartow Burr, first wife of Aaron Burr
- Luther Martin, American lawyer and politician
- William Evans Burton, English actor, playwright, theater manager and publisher
- Thomas S. Hamblin, English actor and theatre manager
- Frances Hodgkinson, actress, wife of actor John Hodgkinson
- Helen Jewett, murder victim

== Gallery ==
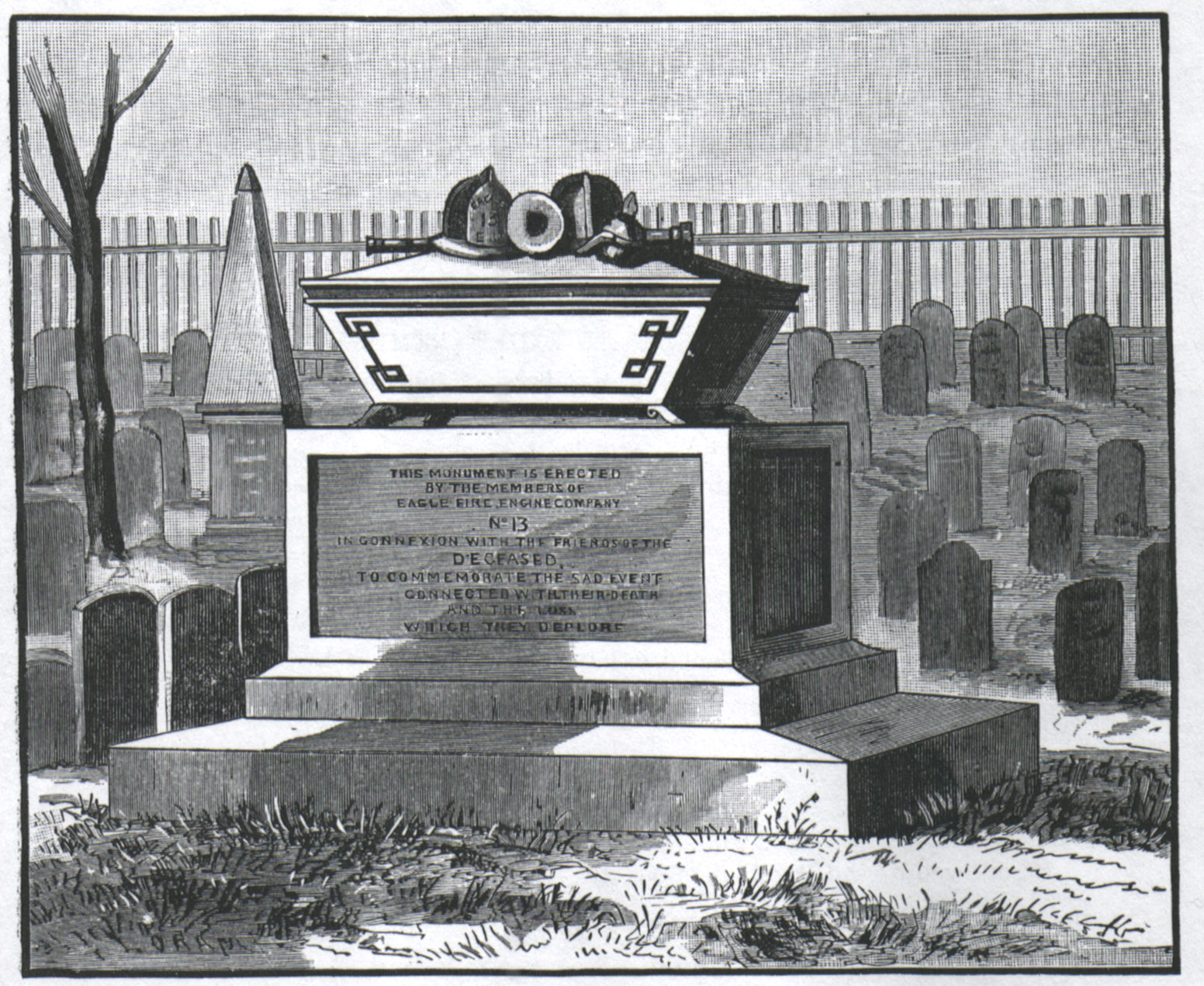
An old print of the firemen's monument in its original place

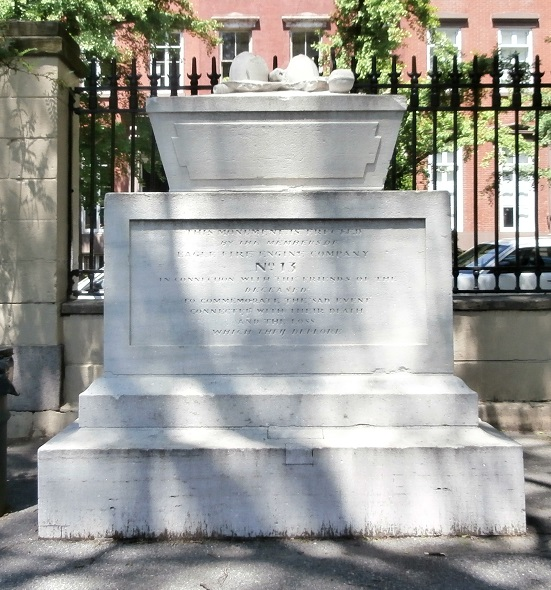
Fireman's Monument

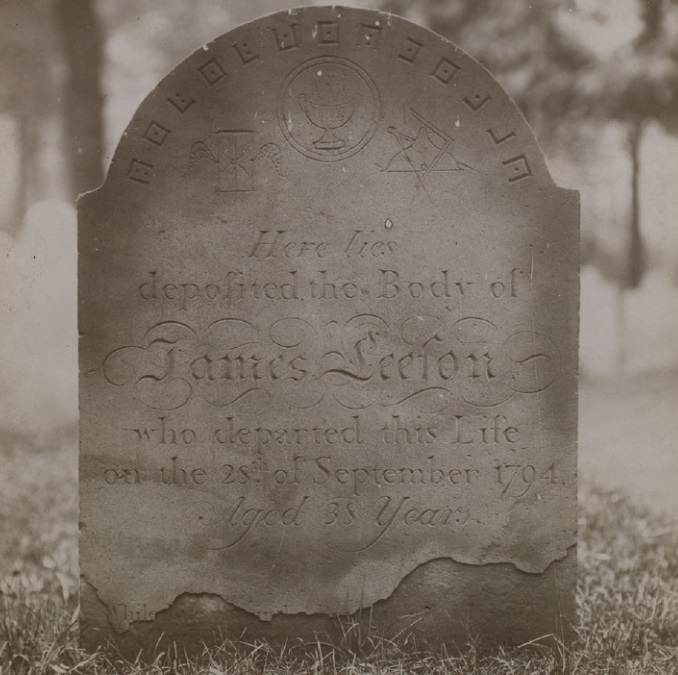
Here lies deposited the body of James Leeson who departed this life on the 28th of September 1794 aged 38 years; his body was moved to Trinity Church Cemetery

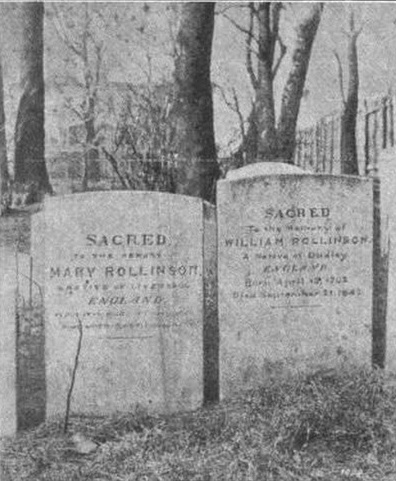
The headstones of William Rollinson, engraver from England, and his wife Mary in St. John's Burying Ground

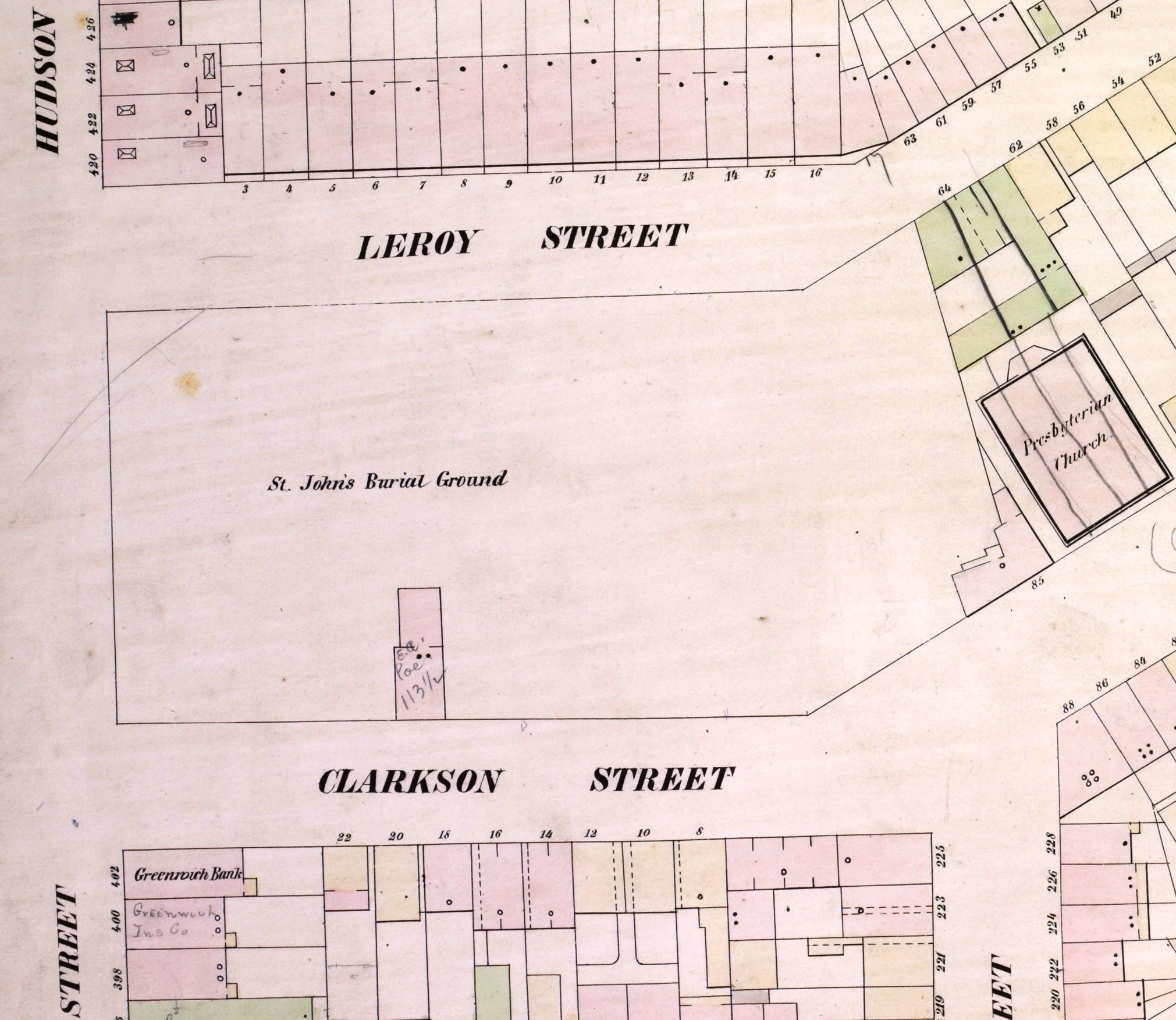
St. John's Burial Ground in 1854. The handwritten note on the one house in the blank area between Clarkson, Leroy and Hudson Streets says "E.A. Poe 113 1/2"

== See also ==
- James J. Walker Park
