= James J. Walker Park =

Public park in Manhattan, New York

Coordinates: 40°43′47″N 74°00′23″W

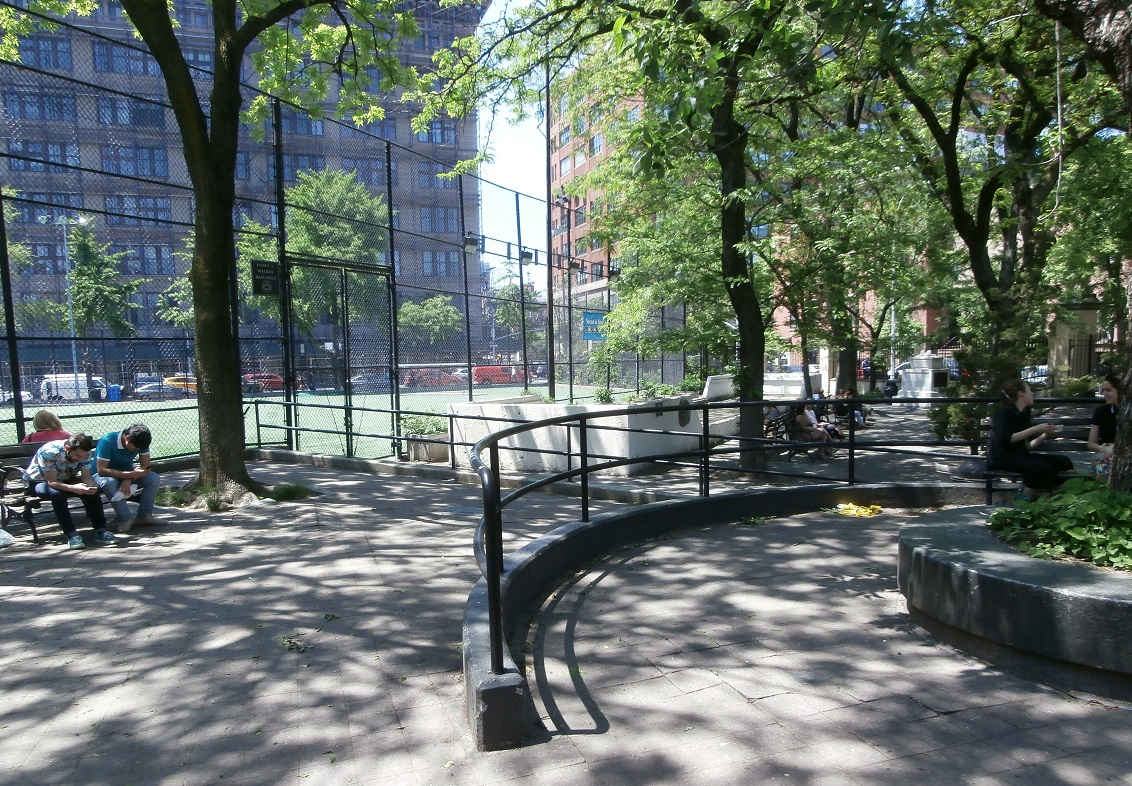
Inside the park (2017)

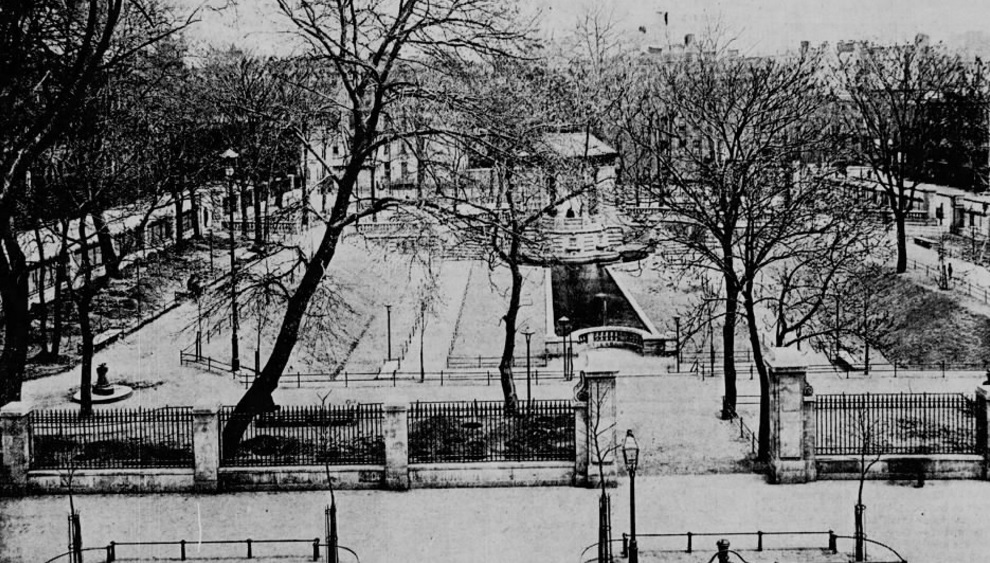
The park in 1899, when it was called "St. John's Park", looking east from Hudson Street

James J. Walker Park is a public park in the Greenwich Village neighborhood of Lower Manhattan in New York City, New York. The approximately 2-acre (0.81 ha) park, is bound by Varick Street, the St. Luke's Place section of Leroy Street, Hudson Street and Clarkson Street. The park has a baseball field, bocce courts, playgrounds, bathrooms, handball courts and Wi-Fi hotspots, as well as a memorial dedicated to two deceased firefighters.

The park is adjacent to the Tony Dapolito Recreation Center, formerly the Carmine Recreation Center in honor of Trinity Episcopal Church vestryman and colonial landowner Nicholas Carman (changed to Carmine to reflect Italians in the area), at the intersection of Carmine and Clarkson Streets with Seventh Avenue South. It was named after a long-time president of Community Board 2, Anthony V. Dapolito, who was known as the "Mayor of Greenwich Village."

== History ==
The area that is now James J. Walker Park was once the St. John's Burying Ground for St. John's Chapel of Trinity Church. It was in use from 1799 to 1858, with over 10,000 burials there. New York politician William H. Walker originated the idea for the park in 1888. In 1890 he succeeded in getting a bill through the legislature condemning the ground for park purposes. The parks department acquired the land in 1895; most of those buried there were not removed.

The park – which was designed by the architectural firm of Carrere & Hastings – was originally called "St. John's Park," which had also been the name of a no-longer-extant park about a mile south on Hudson Street from about 1827 to 1867. The later park was renamed "Hudson Park" in 1896, and finally became "James J. Walker Park" in 1947, named after former mayor Jimmy Walker, whose family had moved to 6 St. Luke's Place in 1886.

The park was renovated in 1972 and again in 1996.

== Notable residents ==
- Edgar Allan Poe, according to a handwritten annotation on an old map

== Gallery ==
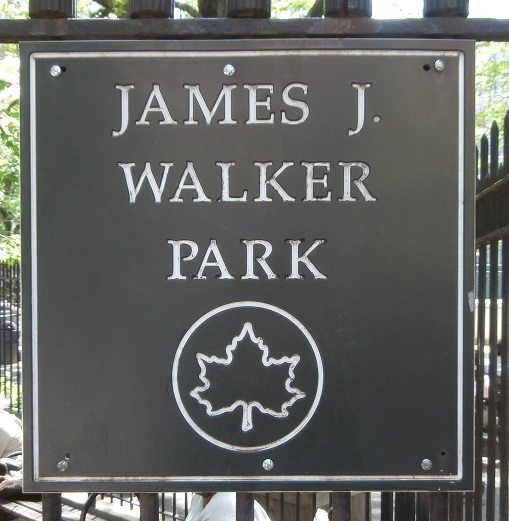
A park sign

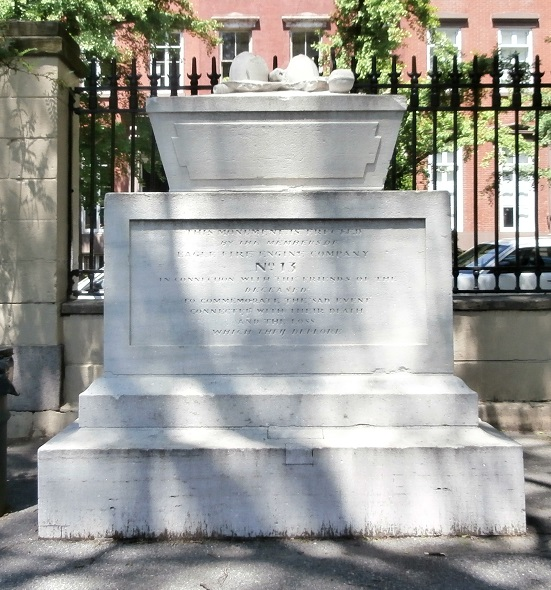
The Firemen's Memorial (1834),
a marble sarcophagus commemorating two men of Eagle Fire Company #13 who died on their first day of duty when a building fell on them.

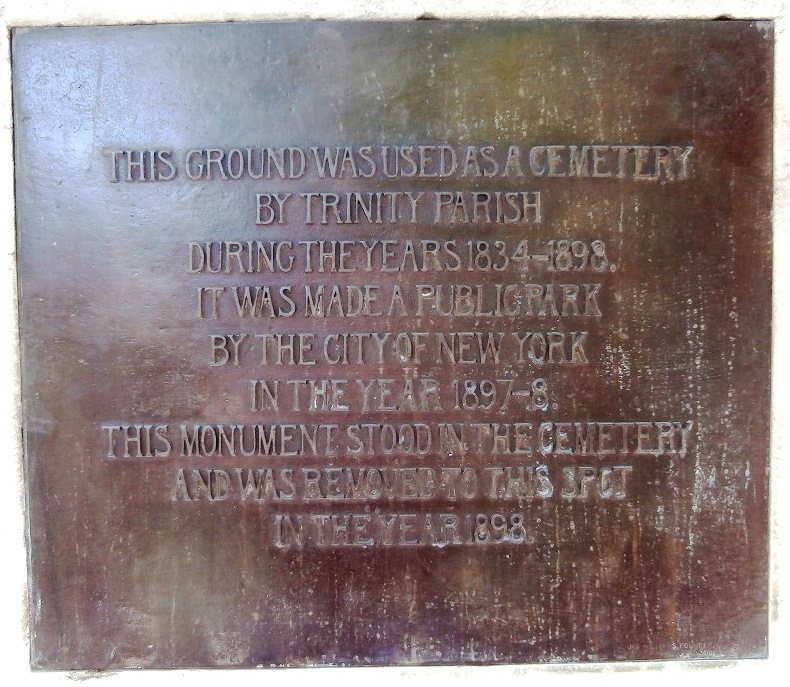
The plaque in front of the Fireman's Memorial, which reads:
"This ground was used as a cemetery in Trinity Parish during the years 1834-1898. It was made a public park by the City of New York in the year 1897-8. This monument stood in the cemetery and was removed to this spot in the year 1898."

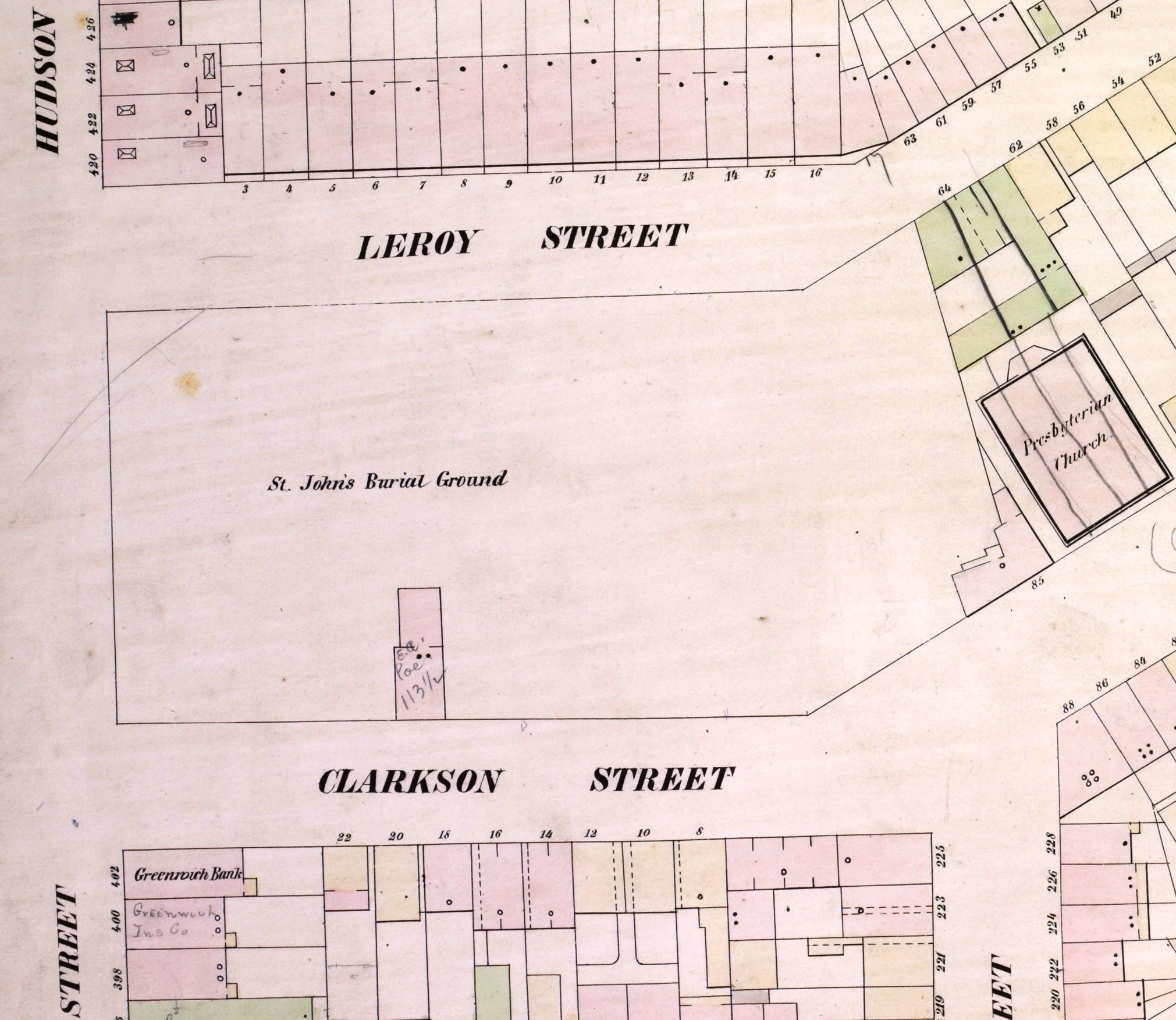
St. John's Burial Ground in 1854.
The handwritten note on the one house in the blank area between Clarkson, Leroy and Hudson Streets says "E.A. Poe 113 1/2"

== See also ==
- St. John's Burying Ground
