= Jacques Marcus Prevost =

British Army officer (1736–1781)

Jacques-Marc Prevost

9th colonial governor of Georgia
- In office 1779–1779
- Preceded by: Archibald Campbell
- Succeeded by: James Wright

Personal details
- Born: Jacques-Marc Prevost; 1736 Republic of Geneva
- Died: 1781 (aged 44–45) British colony of Jamaica
- Spouse: Theodosia Bartow (m. 1763)
- Children: 5, including John
- Profession: Army officer, governor

James Marcus or Mark Prevost (born Jacques-Marc Prevost; 1736 – 1781) was a British Army officer. After being commissioned in Europe, he commanded troops of the British Army in North America and the West Indies, including during the French and Indian War, the North American front of the Seven Years' War.

Prevost was recalled to service during the American Revolutionary War, when he served briefly as colonial governor of the Province of Georgia in 1778 after the British occupied Savannah, Georgia. He also served more than once in the West Indies and died in Jamaica of wounds suffered earlier in the war.

== Early life ==
Prevost was born in 1736 in the French-speaking Republic of Geneva to a family originally from Bossy near Geneva. He had eight siblings, including elder brothers Augustine (born 1723) and Jacques Prevost (born 1725). The two elder brothers both served in the armies of the King of Sardinia and of the Dutch Republic.

== Seven Years' War ==
Prevost appears to have joined his two brothers in the military in the Netherlands. They were recruited and commissioned as officers by Great Britain for its new Royal American Regiment: Augustine received the rank of major, Jacques the rank of colonel, and Jacques Marcus the rank of captain. In the Thirteen colonies, Britain recruited German and Swiss immigrant settlers as soldiers for the regiment after General Edward Braddock's defeat in 1755 in western Pennsylvania in the French and Indian Wars. Britain was threatened by war with France as part of the Seven Years' War in Europe.

The three Prevost brothers were sent as officers to North America in 1756. Jacques Marcus was wounded at the battle of Ticonderoga in New York in 1758. Augustine was also seriously wounded that year, while serving with General James Wolfe's army near Quebec. The two Prevost brothers recuperated in New York City. Augustine served further with the Royal American Regiment, especially in the Caribbean, rising to lieutenant colonel.

After recovery, in 1761 Jacques Marcus traveled with Henry Bouquet, a Swiss colonel in the Royal American Regiment, to set up a British post at Presque Isle (present-day Erie, Pennsylvania). They intended to deter French troops at Fort Niagara. Prevost was next assigned to command a body of troops in New York City; after Britain defeated France and military activity was reduced, he was put on half pay.

== Marriage and family ==
While in New York City convalescing, Jacques Marc had met Theodosia Stillwell Bartow. They married in Trinity Church in 1763. They had five children together, including Augustine James Frederick Prevost (1765–1842) and John Bartow Prevost (1766–1825).

While Jacques was away fighting for the British in the West Indies, his wife Theodosia formed a relationship with an American colonel named Aaron Burr, who was ten years younger than her. In 1781, soon after learning of her husband's death, the newly widowed Theodosia got remarried to the young Burr, who adopted the Prevost family's five children. Burr and Theodosia had another five children together, but only their daughter Theodosia Burr Alston survived to adulthood, and was later lost at sea.

== Northwest wars ==
Prevost's next assignment was to command a detachment of Bouquet's force at Fort Loudoun on the Pennsylvania frontier. He fought against Native American forces in the Muskingum River Valley of present-day Ohio, returning to Theodosia in New York in 1765.

Prevost went back onto half pay for several years. After his unit was posted to the West Indies in 1772, he returned to New York in 1773. By then the couple had moved to their Ho-Ho-Kus, New Jersey residence, called The Hermitage.

== American War of Independence ==
At the outbreak of the American War of Independence, Prevost was a lieutenant-colonel living at home in Paramus, New Jersey. He and his elder brother, brigadier general Augustine Prevost, were stationed at St. Augustine to help lead the Southern campaign for the British. Jaques Marcus Prevost led British troops at the Battle of Brier Creek, a rout of the Americans that reversed their momentum and delayed the eventual outcome by a year. The battle culminated with the British capture of Savannah in December 1778, where Prevost was briefly assigned as British governor of Georgia, in succession to Archibald Campbell. Georgia was the only American state to be retaken by the British in the war. Sent with troops to Jamaica to put down an uprising in 1781, he died there that year of wounds suffered earlier in the war.

While Prevost was in the South fighting successfully for the British, his wife Theodosia Bartow Prevost was at their home in New Jersey hosting George Washington and other leaders of the Continental Army. Guests at their home included James Madison, Alexander Hamilton, and Aaron Burr. Burr, ten years younger than Prevost's wife, courted her in his absence and married her soon after his death in Jamaica.
