= Theodosia Burr Alston =

American socialite, daughter of Aaron Burr (1783–1813)

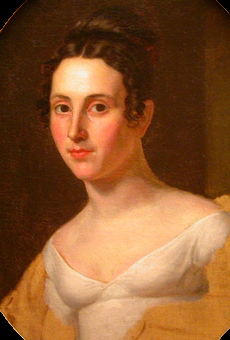
- Portrait by John Vanderlyn, c. 1815–1820
- Born: Theodosia Burr; June 21, 1783; Albany, Province of New York
- Disappeared: January 2 or 3, 1813 (aged 29); Atlantic Ocean off Georgetown, South Carolina, U.S.
- Spouse: Joseph Alston (m. 1801)
- Children: 1
- Parents: Aaron Burr (father); Theodosia Bartow Prevost (mother)

Theodosia Burr Alston (June 21, 1783 – January 2 or 3, 1813) was an American socialite and the daughter of Aaron Burr, the third vice president of the United States, and Theodosia Bartow Prevost. She became first lady of South Carolina after her husband, Joseph Alston, became governor of South Carolina during the War of 1812. Theodosia was lost at sea at age 29, and her fate has become the subject of much speculation in the centuries since.

== Early life ==
Theodosia was born to Aaron Burr and Theodosia Bartow Prevost in Albany, New York, a year after they married. Theodosia's mother was the widow of Jacques Marcus Prevost, a British Army officer who had settled in New York City; she had five other children from that marriage and was nine years Burr's senior.

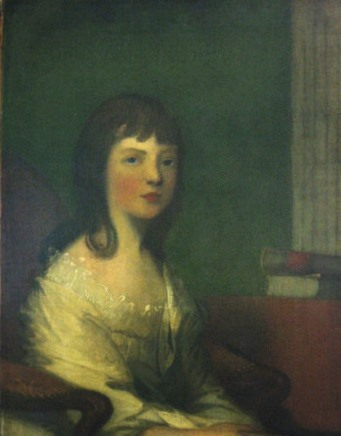
Theodosia in 1794, around the time of her mother's death. Portrait by Gilbert Stuart.

Theodosia was raised mostly in New York City. Her education was closely supervised by her father, who stressed mental discipline. In addition to the more conventional subjects such as French (the French textbook by Martel, Martel's Elements, published by Van Alen in New York in 1796, is dedicated to Theodosia), music and dancing, the young Theodosia began to study arithmetic, Latin, Greek and English composition. She applied herself to English in the form of letters to her father, which were responded to promptly; the replies included detailed criticism. Their correspondence numbered thousands of letters.

Theodosia's mother died when her daughter was eleven years old. After this event, her father closely supervised his daughter's social education, including training in an appreciation of the arts. By the age of 14, she began to serve as hostess at Richmond Hill, Burr's stately home in what is now Greenwich Village. Once, when Burr was away in 1797, his daughter presided over a dinner for Joseph Brant, chief of the Six Nations. On this occasion, she invited physicians David Hosack and Samuel Bard, and Bishop Benjamin Moore, among other notables.

== Marriage to Joseph Alston ==
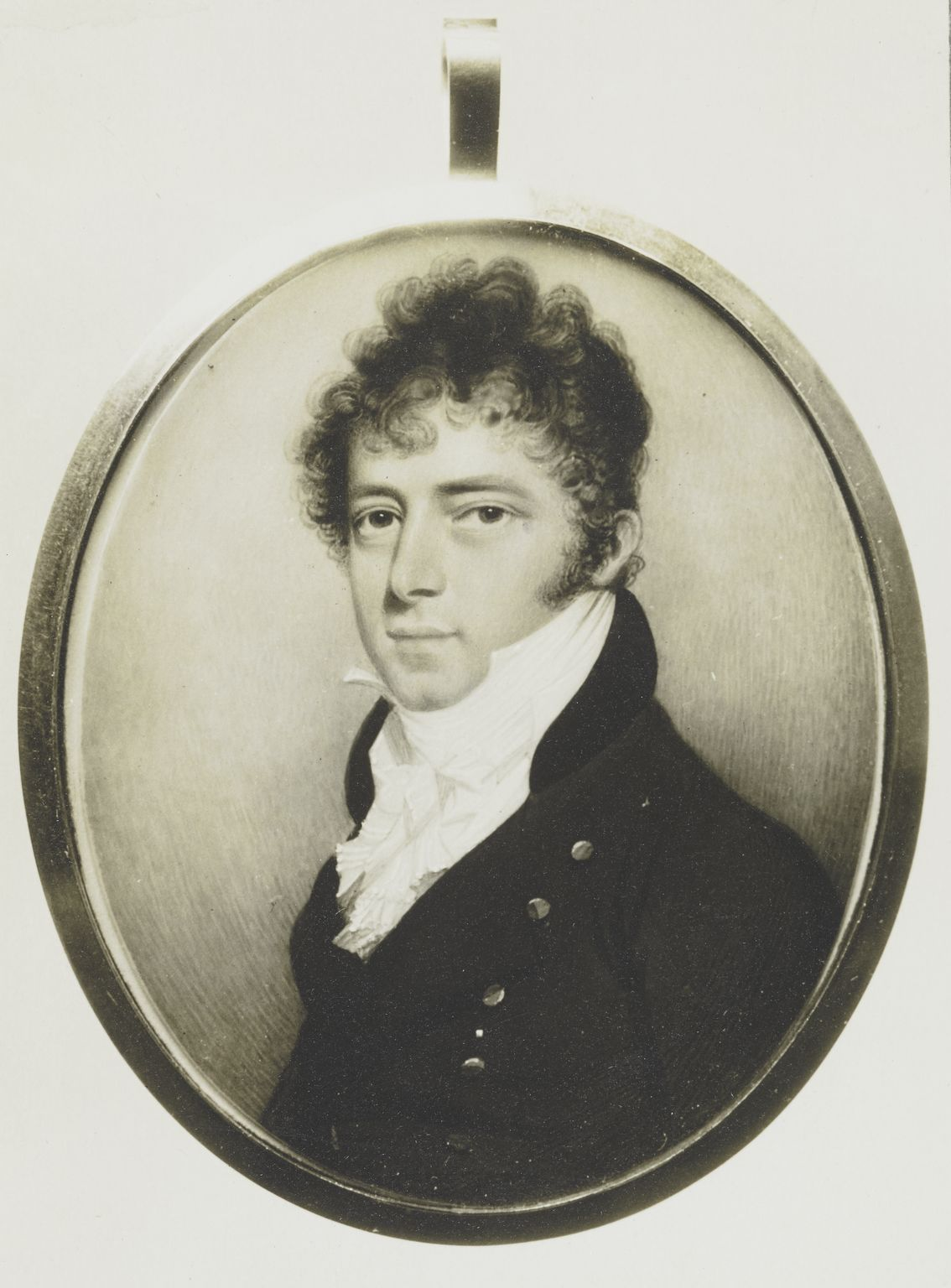
Joseph Alston

In 1801, Theodosia married Joseph Alston, a wealthy landowner from South Carolina. They honeymooned at Niagara Falls, the first recorded couple to do so. It has been conjectured that there was more than romance involved in this union. Burr agonized intensely and daily about money matters, particularly as to how he would hold on to the Richmond Hill estate. It is thought that his daughter's tie to a member of the Southern gentry might relieve him of some of his financial burdens. The marriage to Alston meant that Theodosia would become socially prominent. Her letters to her father indicated that she had formed an affectionate alliance with her husband. The couple's son was born in 1802.

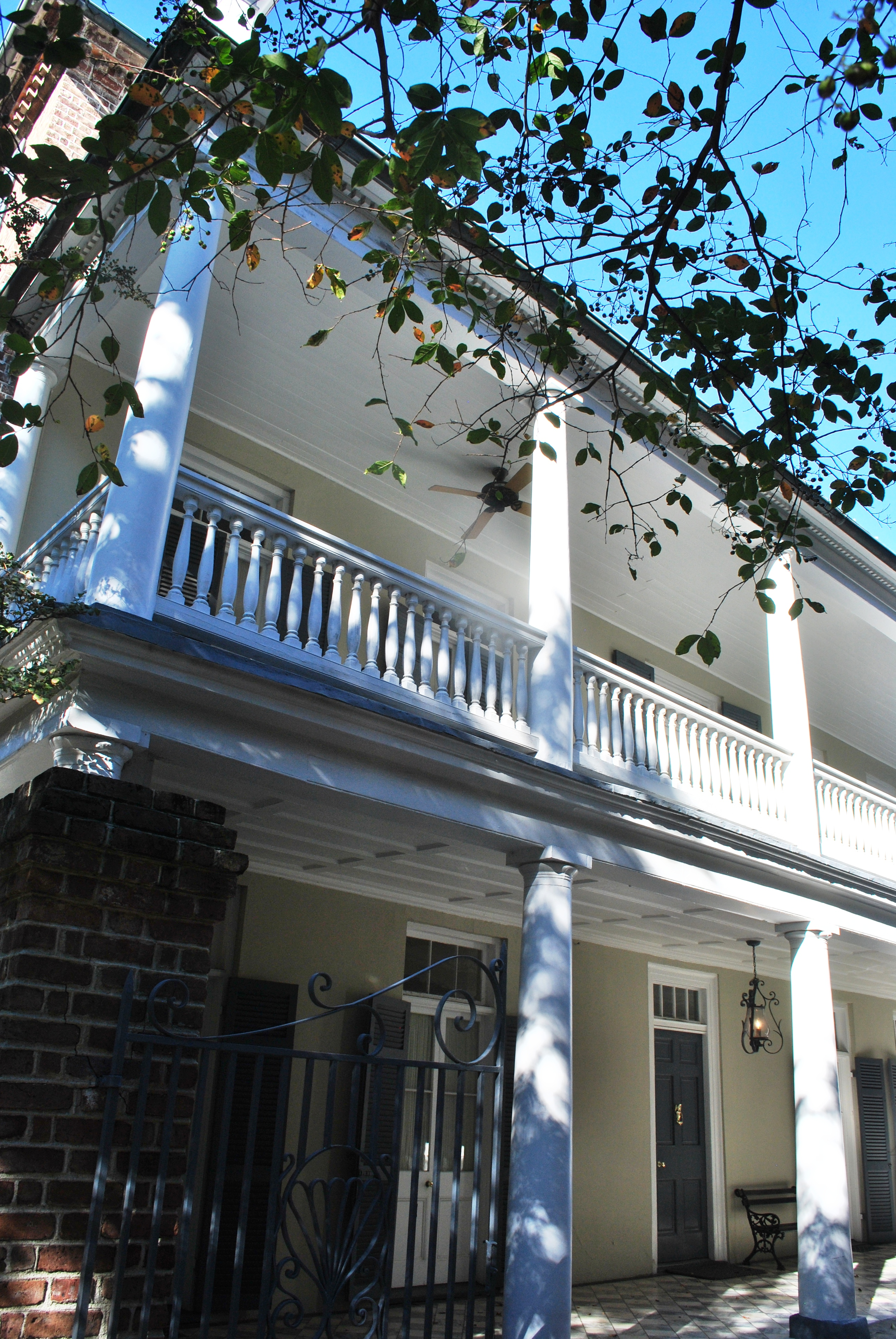
Thomas Bee's House, c. 1730. A later owner was governor Joseph Alston and his wife Theodosia, daughter of Aaron Burr.

Following the baby's birth, Theodosia's health became fragile. She made trips to Saratoga Springs and Ballston Spa, New York, to restore her health. She also visited her father and accompanied him to Ohio in the summer of 1806, along with her son. There, Aaron met with an Irishman, Harman Blennerhassett, who had an island estate on the Ohio River in what is now West Virginia. The two men made plans which were later joined by General James Wilkinson; however, what exactly those plans were is not definitively known due to lack of supporting evidence for any of the popular allegations.

== Trial of Aaron Burr ==
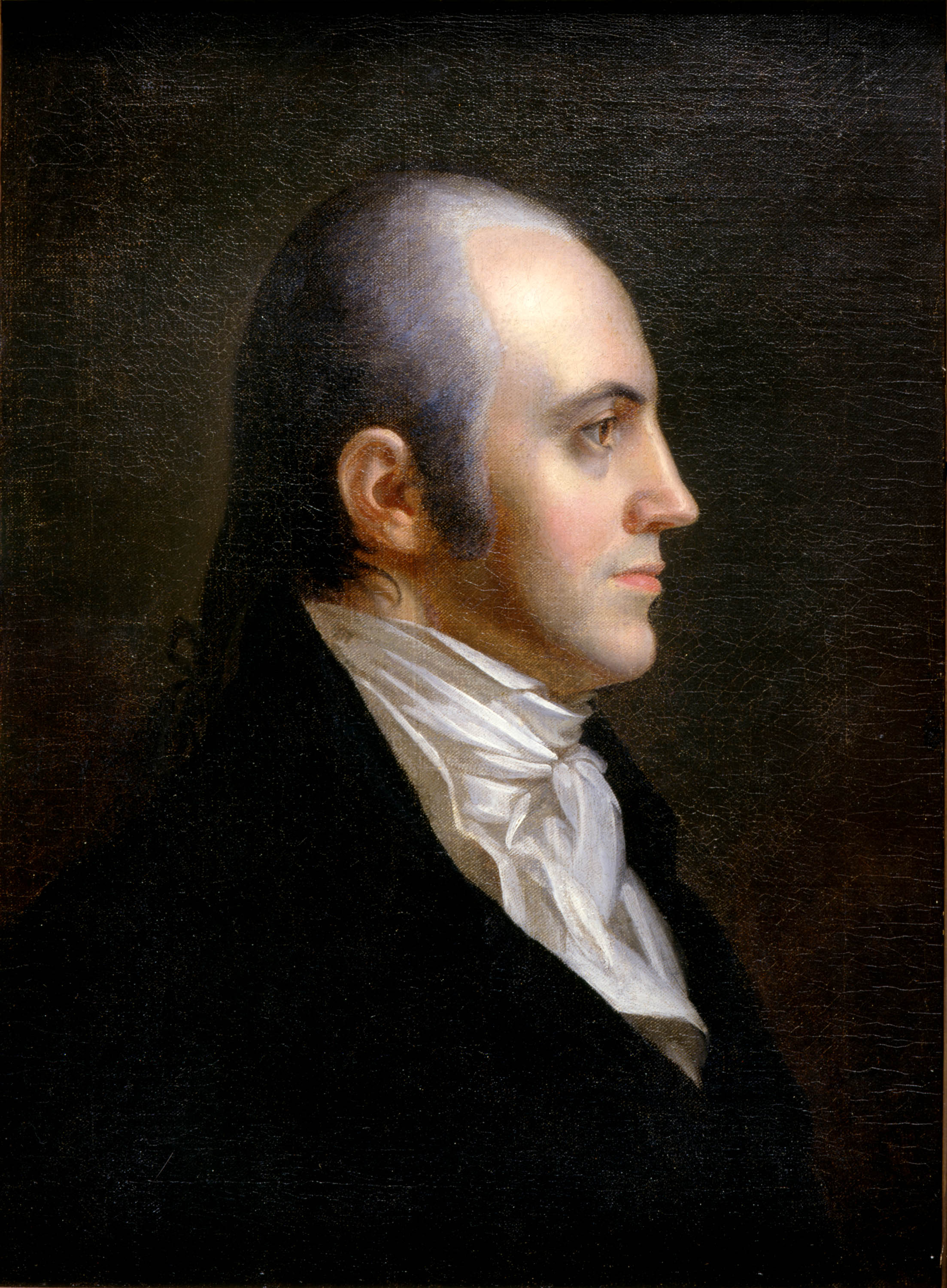
Aaron Burr in an 1802 portrait

In the spring of 1807, Burr was arrested for treason. During his trial in Richmond, Virginia, Theodosia was with him, providing comfort and support. Burr was acquitted but left the U.S. to live as an exile in Europe, where he remained for four years. During that period, Theodosia acted as his agent in the U.S., raising money that she sent to him and transmitting messages. She wrote letters to Secretary of the Treasury Albert Gallatin and to First Lady Dolley Madison in an effort to secure a smooth return for her father.

Theodosia's son succumbed to malaria and died on June 30, 1812, at ten years of age. The resulting anguish affected her health, to the point of preventing her from traveling to New York upon her father's return from Europe in July 1812. Unable to join him, she had to wait until December before she could make the journey.

== Disappearance at sea ==
Several months after the War of 1812 broke out, Theodosia's husband was sworn in as governor of South Carolina on December 10. As head of the state militia, he could not accompany Theodosia on her trip to New York. Burr arranged for Timothy Green, who possessed some medical knowledge, to accompany her instead.

On December 31, 1812, Theodosia sailed aboard the schooner Patriot. The vessel had originally been built as a pilot boat and had served as a privateer during the war, when it was commissioned by the U.S. government to prey on English shipping; she gained a subsequent reputation for speed. Patriot had been refitted in December in Georgetown, South Carolina, its guns dismounted and hidden below decks. Its name was painted over and any indication of recent activity was entirely erased. The schooner's captain, William Overstocks, desired to make a rapid run to New York with his cargo; it is likely that the ship was laden with the proceeds from its privateering raids.

Patriot and all those on board were never heard from again.

=== Rumor and folklore ===
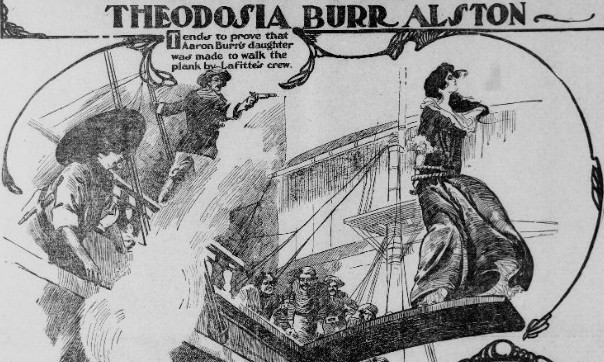
The San Francisco Call's cartoon about Theodosia's possible fate.

Immediately following Patriot's disappearance, rumors arose. The most enduring was that Patriot had been captured by pirates, and that something had occurred near Hatteras Island, North Carolina, an area notorious for local wreckers who lured ships into the island's dangerous shoals.

Burr refused to credit any of the rumors of his daughter's possible capture, believing that she had died in a shipwreck. But the rumors persisted long after his death, and after around 1850, more substantial "explanations" of the mystery surfaced, usually alleging to be from the deathbed confessions of sailors and from criminals about to be executed.

- One story which was considered somewhat plausible was that Patriot had fallen prey to wreckers known as the Carolina "bankers," who operated near Nags Head, North Carolina, and were known for pirating wrecks and murdering both passengers and crews. When the sea did not serve up wrecks for their plunder, they lured ships onto the shoals. On stormy nights the bankers would hobble a horse, tie a lantern around the animal's neck and walk it up and down the beach. Sailors at sea could not distinguish the bobbing light they saw from that of a ship that was anchored securely. Often, they steered toward shore to find shelter. Instead, they became wrecked on the banks, after which their crews and passengers were killed. In relation to this, Mr. J.A. Elliott of Norfolk, Virginia, made a statement in 1910 that in the early part of 1813, the dead body of a young woman "with every indication of refinement" had been washed ashore at Cape Charles and had been buried on her finder's farm.
- Writing in Charleston's News and Courier newspaper, Foster Haley claimed that documents he had discovered in the state archives in Mobile, Alabama, reported that Patriot had been captured by a pirate vessel captained by John Howard Payne and that every person on board had been murdered by the pirates, including "a woman who was obviously a noblewoman or a lady of high birth". However, Haley never identified or cited the documents he had supposedly found.
- The most romantic legend involves piracy and a Karankawa chief on the Gulf Coast of Texas. The earliest American settlers to the Gulf Coast testified of a Karankawa warrior wearing a gold locket inscribed "Theodosia." He had claimed that after a terrible storm, he had found a ship wrecked at the mouth of the San Bernard River. Hearing a faint cry, he boarded the hulk and found a white woman, naked except for the gold locket, chained to a bulkhead by her ankle. The woman fainted on seeing the warrior, and he managed to pull her free and carry her to the shore. When she revived, she told him that she was the daughter of a great chief of the white men, who was misunderstood by his people and had to leave his country. She gave him the locket and told him that if he ever met white men, he was to show them the locket and tell them the story, and then she died in his arms.
- Another myth traces its origin to Charles Gayarré's 1872 novel Fernando de Lemos: Truth and Fiction. Gayarré devoted one chapter to a fictional confession by the pirate Dominique Youx, admitting to having captured Patriot after discovering it dismasted off Cape Hatteras following a storm. In Gayarré's account, Youx and his men murdered the crew, while Theodosia was made to walk the plank: "She stepped on it and descended into the sea with graceful composure, as if she had been alighting from a carriage," Gayarré wrote in Youx's voice. "She sank, and rising again, she, with an indescribable smile of angelic sweetness, waved her hand to me as if she meant to say: 'Farewell, and thanks again'; and then sank forever." Because Gayarré billed his novel as a mixture of "truth and fiction" there was popular speculation about whether his account of Youx's confession might be real, and the story entered American folklore.
- American folklorist Edward Rowe Snow later published an account in Strange Tales from Nova Scotia to Cape Hatteras, incorporating the Gayarré story with later offshoots. For example, a woman named Harriet Sprague made a sworn statement before a Michigan notary on February 14, 1903, claiming to corroborate details in Gayarré's novel concerning Youx's confession. Sprague described the contents of an 1848 confession by pirate Frank Burdick, an alleged shipmate of Youx when Patriot was attacked. In Burdick's version, the pirates left most of Theodosia's clothing untouched, as well as a portrait of her. Later, "wreckers" (locals known for rifling stranded vessels in often-criminal fashion) discovered the deserted Patriot, and one of them carried the painting and clothing ashore. A legend later arose in Bald Head Island, North Carolina, that Theodosia roams the beaches searching for the painting.
- A popular (though very improbable) local story in Alexandria, Virginia, suggests that Alston may have been the mysterious Female Stranger who died at Gadsby's Tavern on October 14, 1816. She was buried in St. Paul's Cemetery with a gravestone inscription that begins: "To the memory of a / FEMALE STRANGER / whose mortal sufferings terminated / on the 14th day of October 1816 / Aged 23 years and 8 months."

==== The Nag's Head Portrait ====
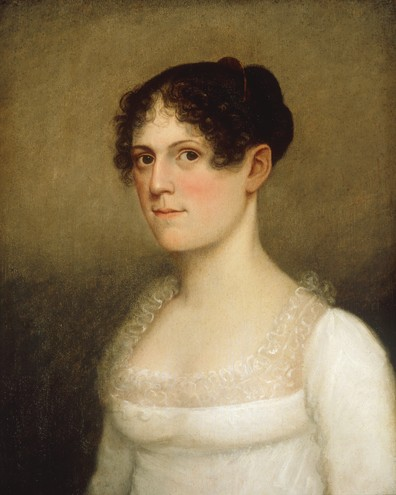
"Nag's Head portrait", Lewis Walpole Library, Farmington, Connecticut.

- In 1869, physician William G. Pool treated Polly Manncaring, an elderly woman in Nag's Head, and noticed an unusually expensive-appearing oil painting on her wall. Manncaring gave it to him as payment and claimed that when she was young, her first husband had discovered it on a wrecked ship during the War of 1812. (Details of the painting in Sprague's story appear to be derived from a separate legend that first appeared in print in 1878.) Pool became convinced the portrait was of Theodosia, and contacted members of her family, some of whom agreed, though Pool conceded that they "cannot say positively if it was her" because none of them had ever seen her. Mary Alston Pringle, who had been Theodosia's sister-in-law, was the only person contacted by Pool who had actually known Theodosia, and Pringle could not recognize the painting as a portrait of her. The portrait is now at Yale University's Lewis Walpole Library.

=== Historical analysis ===
A less romantic analysis of the known facts has led some scholars to conclude that Patriot was probably wrecked by a storm off Cape Hatteras. Logbooks from the blockading British fleet report a severe storm that began off the Carolina coast in the afternoon of January 2, 1813, and continued into the next day.

James L. Michie, an archaeologist from South Carolina who studied the course of the storm, concluded that Patriot was likely just north of Cape Hatteras when the storm was at its fiercest. "If the ship managed to escape this battering, which continued until midnight," Michie said, "it then faced near hurricane-force winds in the early hours of Sunday. Given this knowledge, Patriot probably sank between 6:00 PM Saturday [January 2] and 8:00 AM Sunday [January 3]."

== Portraits ==
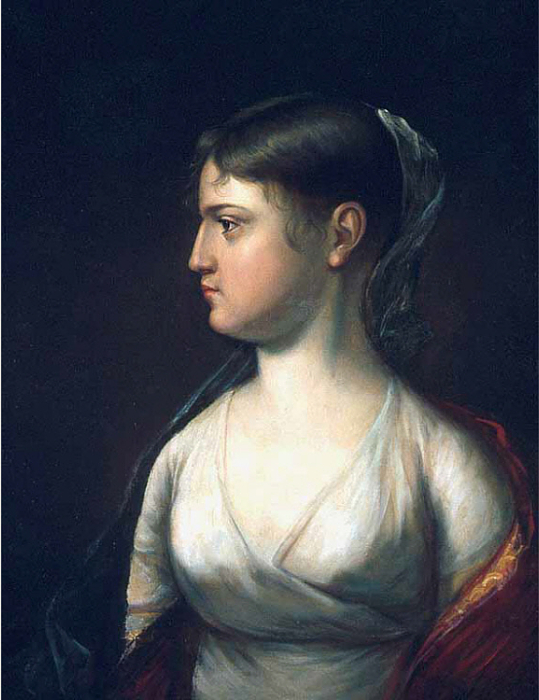
Portrait of Theodosia Burr, artist unknown, copy after Vanderlyn

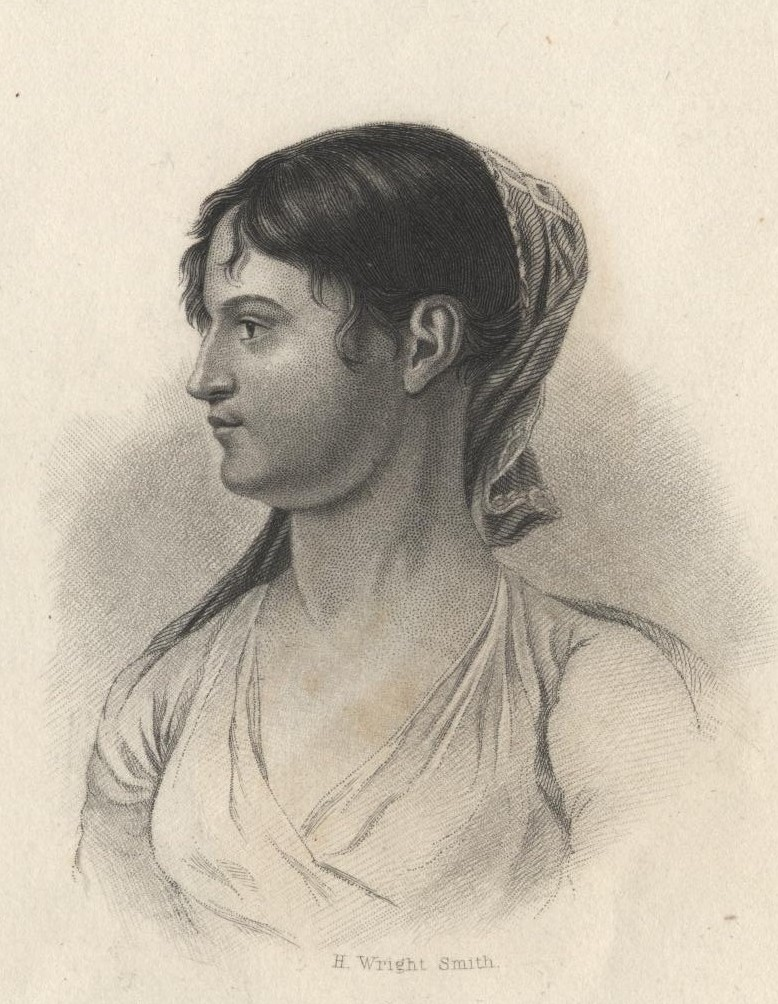
- Theodosia Burr Alston, engraving by H. Wright Smith
  Gilbert Stuart painted a portrait of the 11-year-old Theodosia Burr in 1794. It is now at Yale University Art Gallery.
- Charles Balthazar Julien Févret de Saint-Mémin painted a profile portrait of the 13-year-old Theodosia Burr in 1796. He made an engraving of it, a copy of which is at the National Portrait Gallery.
- A portrait miniature of a young woman, attributed to John Wesley Jarvis, is identified as Theodosia Burr Alston. Two copies of the miniature were made and are attributed to Charles Fraser. One was handed down in the Alston family, and it illustrated the cover of Richard N. Côté's 2002 biography Theodosia Burr Alston: Portrait of a Prodigy.
- Pendant portraits of Vice President Burr and his daughter were painted by John Vanderlyn in 1802. They are at the New York Historical Society.
- A miniature of Theodosia Burr Alston (c. 1811) by an unknown artist, based on the Vanderlyn portrait, is at the Gibbes Museum of Art in Charleston, South Carolina.
- The Nag's Head Portrait, a Federal Era portrait of an unidentified woman by an unidentified artist, was acquired in 1869 in Nag's Head, North Carolina. As discussed above, the owner believed it to be a previously unknown portrait of Theodosia Burr Alston. In the 20th century, the Nag's Head Portrait was owned by Ann Burr Auchincloss, and since 1980 it has been at Yale University's Lewis Walpole Library.

== In popular culture ==
- Theda Bara (1885–1955), born Theodosia Burr Goodman, was a silent film actress named for Theodosia Burr.
- Theodosia Burr was the subject of Anya Seton's first novel, My Theodosia (1941).
- Theodosia Burr was mentioned in Robert Frost's 1953 poem "Kitty Hawk", published in In the Clearing (1962).
- Theodosia Burr Alston was a character in Gore Vidal's historical novel Burr (1973).
- Theodosia Burr Alston was a character in Michael Parker's novel The Watery Part of the World (2011).
- Theodosia Burr is the namesake of the cryostat of a Cosmic Microwave Background experiment.
- Despite not actually having an appearance, Theodosia Burr is mentioned in the Broadway musical Hamilton (2015) by Lin-Manuel Miranda, most prominently in the song "Dear Theodosia", which her father (originally played by Leslie Odom Jr.) sings to celebrate her birth. She is mentioned later in the musical in the song "The World Was Wide Enough", where the elder Burr explains he will not let himself be shot by Alexander Hamilton in their duel, so that Theodosia will not become an orphan. She is spoken of in two other Off-broadway songs, such as the original version of "Schuyler Defeated" where she's described as her father's "pride and joy", and a fully cut song called "Dear Theodosia [Reprise]", where a heartbroken Burr tells Theodosia of her mother's death.

== See also ==
- List of people who disappeared mysteriously at sea
