= Francis Barber (colonel) =

Continental Army officer

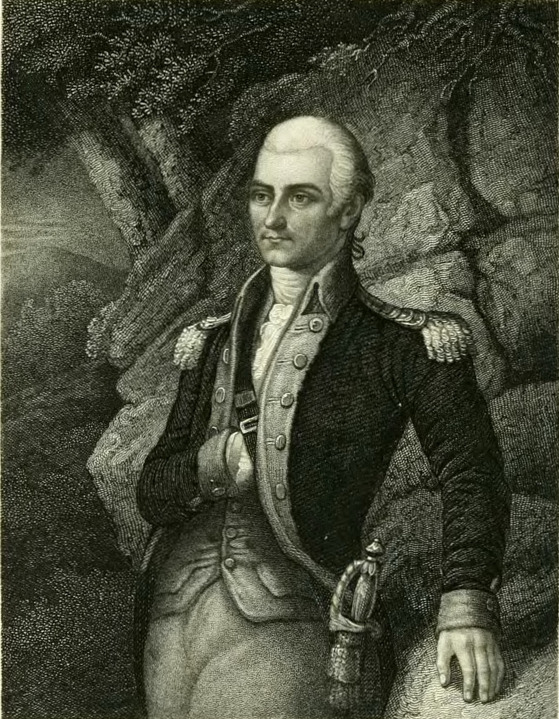
- Born: 1750
- Died: February 2, 1783 (aged 32–33); New Windsor, New York, U.S.
- Military career
- Allegiance: United States
- Branch: Continental Army
- Rank: Colonel
- Conflicts: American Revolutionary War; Sullivan Expedition; Siege of Yorktown; Battle of Monmouth; Battle of Newton

Francis Barber (1750–1783) was a colonel in the Continental Army during the American Revolutionary War. He was in the Sullivan Expedition and at the Siege of Yorktown with the 3rd New Jersey Regiment. He was wounded at the Battle of Monmouth and again at the Battle of Newton. He was killed in New Windsor, New York, where the army was camped in 1783, when a tree that was being cut fell on him as he was riding his horse to dine with George Washington in Newburgh, New York.

== Elizabethtown Academy ==
Barber was appointed headmaster of the classical prep school Elizabethtown Academy in 1771. His students included Alexander Hamilton and Aaron Burr.
