= Snyder Academy =

Former classical school in Elizabeth, New Jersey

Coordinates: 40°39′49″N 74°12′56″W

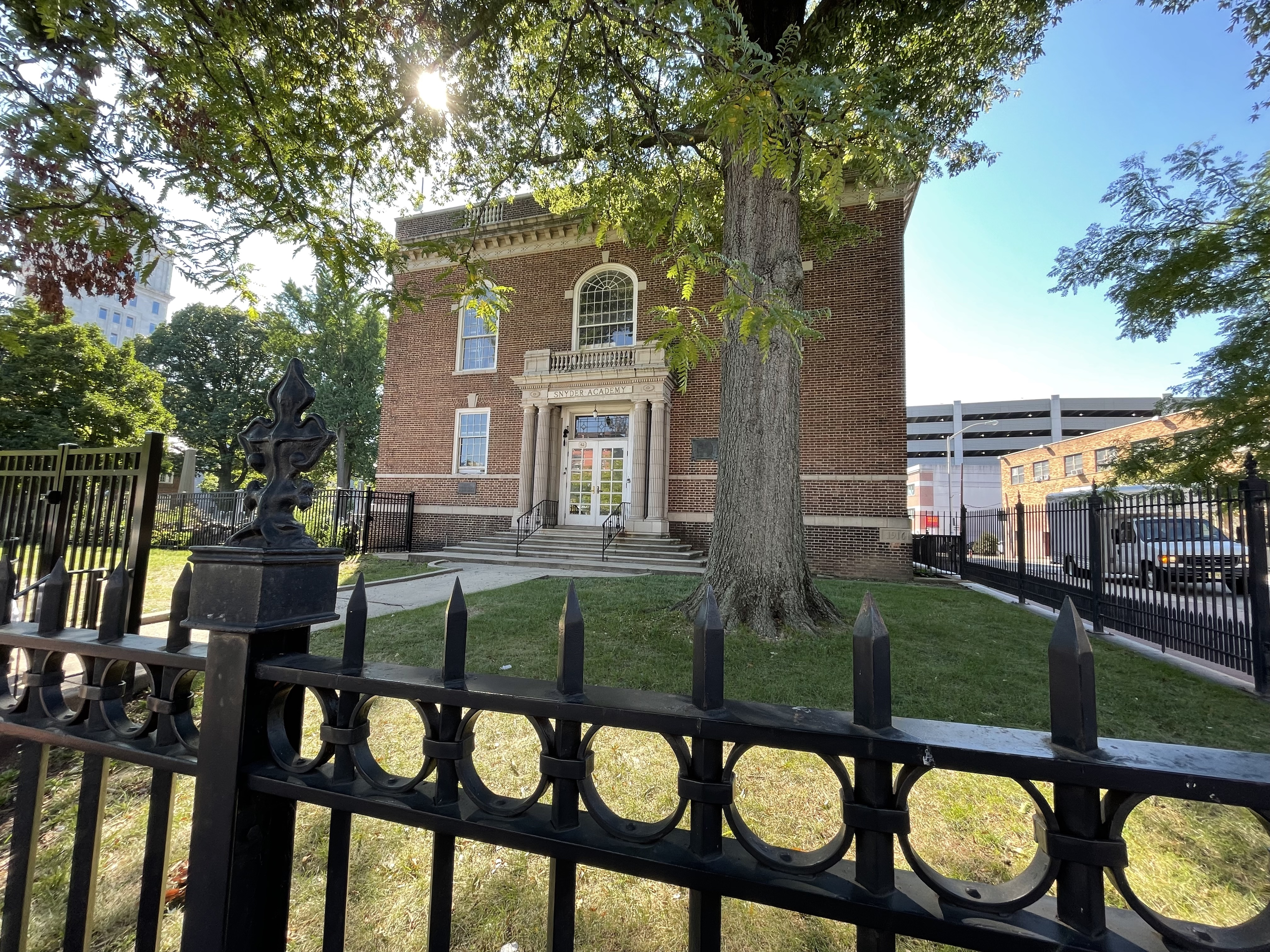
Snyder Academy facing Broad Street in Elizabeth, New Jersey

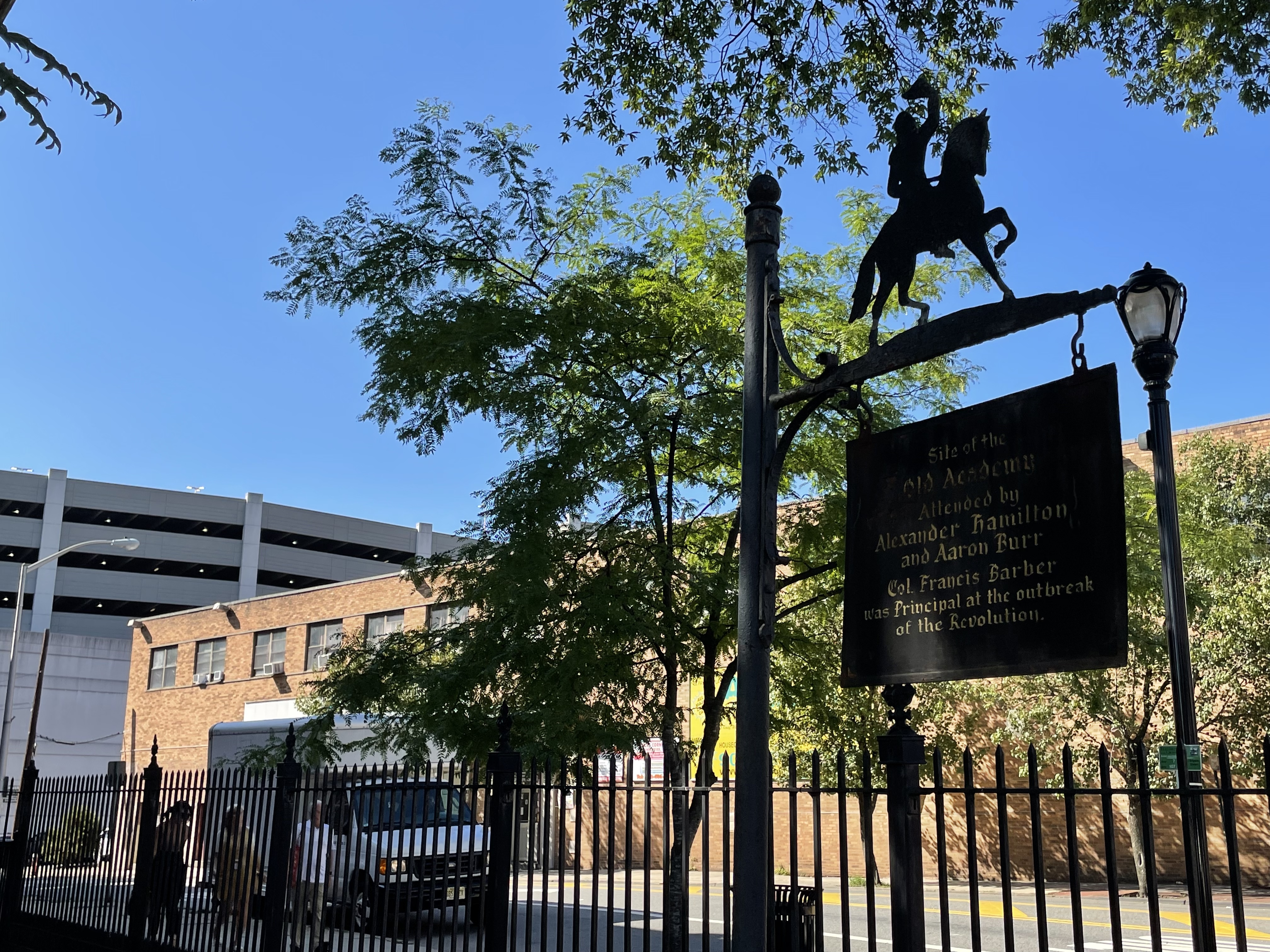
Signage at the academy indicating the presence of Hamilton, Burr, and Barber

Snyder Academy, formerly known as the Elizabethtown Academy, was a prep classical school in Elizabeth, New Jersey, founded in 1767. The academy was attended by Alexander Hamilton and Aaron Burr. Revolutionary war colonel Francis Barber was named its headmaster in 1771.

== History ==
=== 18th century ===
Referred to historically as the "Elizabethtown Academy", "The Old Academy", or simply "The Academy", it was noted as a leading prep school in the late 18th century. The original building was opened in 1767 as a prep school for classics. Col. Francis Barber was named its headmaster in 1771; his pupils included both Alexander Hamilton and Aaron Burr, though they did not attend at the same time. As one historian explained, "There is no record that they met, but they knew the same people."

Hamilton, a poor boy with little education but whose brilliance was recognized by his sponsors, was 15 when he began attendance by the time Burr had already graduated. Hamilton was known to awake at dawn and wander the cemetery next door as he practiced his Greek and Latin. Francis Barber would eventually resign from the school to join the Continental Army. He survived the Revolutionary War only to be killed by a falling tree in 1783. Hamilton would be later killed by Burr in the Burr–Hamilton duel.

The academy was burned during a British raid on February 25, 1779 and later rebuilt in 1787.

=== 19th century ===
It closed again in 1834, becoming the first Session House of the First Church. It was rebuilt in 1863 and again in 1917. It has been used as a Parish House, offices and Sunday School. The academy was eventually named the Snyder Academy of Elizabethtown, in honor of the Harold B. and Dorothy A. Snyder Foundation that provided funding for its reconstruction and renovation.

=== 20th and 21st centuries ===
The academy presently includes a museum, 250-seat theater and art studio, and space for educational services and community events.
