= Johann Michael Lavien =

Caribbean merchant and planter (1717–1771)

- Born: c. 1717
- Died: February 28, 1771 (aged 53–54); Frederiksted, Saint Croix
- Other name: John Lavien
- Occupations: Merchant; planter
- Spouses: Rachael Fawcett (1729–1768) (m. 1745; div. 1759); [name unknown] (died 1768)
- Children: Peter Lavien (1746–1781)

Johann Michael Lavien (or John Lavien) (c. 1717 – February 28, 1771) was a merchant and planter who lived on the Caribbean islands of Nevis and Saint Croix. He was the first husband of Rachael Fawcett, who later became the mother of Alexander Hamilton, one of the Founding Fathers of the United States.

== Biography ==
=== Career ===
As a young man "who had peddled household goods and now aspired to planter status", Lavien moved from Nevis, an island in the British West Indies, to St. Croix in the Danish Virgin Islands. On St. Croix, Lavien purchased a sugar plantation (later known as Estate Ruby), and by 1744, he had established himself as a planter and cultivated the appearance of wealth.

From 1748 to 1760, he owned at least sixteen slaves, including 5 to 7 children. After incurring significant debts, Lavien sold his last remaining plantation in 1753, after which he worked his slaves on the properties of other planters. In 1761, Lavien moved to Frederiksted, on the opposite side of St. Croix, where he speculated in real estate, and had some income from renting out his remaining slaves.

By 1768, a steep decline in his fortunes had left him working as a hospital janitor in Frederiksted.

=== Marriage and divorce ===
In 1745, at the age of about twenty-eight, Lavien met and married Rachel Faucette, who was then sixteen years old. Her mother, Mary Uppington Faucette, was British, and her father John was a French Huguenot physician who had recently died. Shortly before the marriage, Rachel had inherited what her son Alexander Hamilton would later call "a snug fortune". Hamilton characterized Lavien as "a fortune hunter ... bedizened with gold" whose expensive clothes caused Rachel's widowed mother to be "captivated by the glitter" of his flashy appearance, and to push Rachel into reluctantly agreeing to what became a "hated marriage".

Lavien and Rachel had one son, Peter, born in 1746. However, in 1750, Rachel refused to live with Lavien any longer, an offense for which Lavien had her jailed under Danish law. She spent several months in a 10- by 13-foot cell with one small window, in the Fort in Christiansted, St. Croix. Soon after being released, she fled to the British West Indies, where she met James Hamilton, fourth son of a Scottish laird. James Hamilton and Faucette moved together to her birthplace, Nevis, and had two sons together, James Jr. and Alexander.

Lavien divorced Rachel in 1759 on grounds of adultery and desertion, under Danish law, which left her legally unable to remarry. Possibly to spare her from charges of bigamy, James Hamilton abandoned Rachel and their sons in 1765. Soon afterward, Rachel moved with the boys to Christiansted.

After learning of Faucette's death in 1768, Lavien used the 1759 divorce decree in probate court to prevent James Jr. and Alexander Hamilton from inheriting any of her property, due to their illegitimate birth. The entire estate went instead to his son Peter.

=== Second marriage and death ===
At some time after his divorce from Rachel, Lavien remarried. With his second wife, he had two sons and a daughter, all of whom died in childhood. Lavien's second wife died in 1768, one month before Rachel's death.

On February 28, 1771, Lavien died in Frederiksted.

== Ethnicity and religion ==
According to recent historians, Johann Lavien was of German origin, although early biographers of Alexander Hamilton followed Hamilton himself in identifying Lavien as a Dane.

Based on the phonetic similarity of "Lavien" to a common Jewish surname, it was suggested that Lavien may have been Jewish or of Jewish descent. According to historian Ron Chernow, "if he was Jewish he managed to conceal his origins. Had he presented himself as a Jew, the snobbish Mary Faucette would certainly have squelched the match [with Rachel] in a world that frowned on religious no less than interracial marriage."

The belief that Lavien was Jewish may have originated with a fictionalized biography of Alexander Hamilton published in 1902 by novelist Gertrude Atherton and was popularized with the rise of antisemitism and anticapitalism in the 1920s and 1930s when Hamilton was portrayed by his opponents as a stereotypical money-hungry Jewish banker". No documented evidence that Lavien was Jewish has been shown to exist. On the foundation of Johann Lavien's hypothesized Judaism, one historian has publicized a theory that Hamilton was Jewish, while acknowledging that this theory "clash[es] with much of the received wisdom on Hamilton".

== Peter Lavien ==
Peter Lavien, born in 1746, was the only child of Johann Lavien and Rachael Fawcett, and the half-brother of Alexander Hamilton. Peter moved to South Carolina in 1764, where he became a prominent shipping merchant. He briefly returned to St. Croix in November 1769 to take possession of his inheritance from his mother's estate.

Peter served as an Anglican church warden at St. Helena's Parish in Beaufort, South Carolina, and was baptized at St. John's Church in Christiansted as an adult.

During the American Revolutionary War, Peter was a Tory and a smuggler. He moved in 1777 to Savannah, Georgia, where he died in 1781.
