= List of vice presidents of the United States by other offices held =

This is a list of vice presidents of the United States by other offices (either elected or appointive) held, either before or after service as the vice president.

== Federal government ==
=== Executive branch ===
==== President ====
President	Year(s) served	Notes
John Adams	1797–1801	First sitting vice president elected president
Thomas Jefferson	1801–1809	Second sitting vice president elected president
Martin Van Buren	1837–1841	Third sitting vice president elected president
John Tyler	1841–1845	Became president after Harrison's death, first vice president to become president upon the death of his predecessor
Millard Fillmore	1850–1853	Became president after Taylor's death
Andrew Johnson	1865–1869	Became president after Lincoln's assassination
Chester A. Arthur	1881–1885	Became president after Garfield's assassination
Theodore Roosevelt	1901–1909	Became president after McKinley's assassination; later elected to own term.
Calvin Coolidge	1923–1929	Became president after Harding's death; later elected to own term.
Harry S. Truman	1945–1953	Became president after Roosevelt's death; later elected to own term.
Lyndon B. Johnson	1963–1969	Became president after Kennedy's assassination; later elected to own term.
Richard Nixon	1969–1974	First former vice president elected president
Gerald Ford	1974–1977	Became president after Nixon's resignation; had been appointed vice president after Agnew's resignation.
George H. W. Bush	1989–1993	Fourth sitting vice president elected president
Joe Biden	2021–2025	Second former vice president elected president

==== Cabinet secretaries ====
Secretary	Office	President served under	Year(s) served	Notes
Thomas Jefferson	Secretary of State	George Washington	1790–1793	
John C. Calhoun	Secretary of War	James Monroe	1817–1825	
John C. Calhoun	Secretary of State	John Tyler	1844–1845	Served after being vice president
Martin Van Buren	Secretary of State	Andrew Jackson	1829–1831	
Henry A. Wallace	Secretary of Agriculture	Franklin D. Roosevelt	1933–1940	
Henry A. Wallace	Secretary of Commerce	Franklin D. Roosevelt	1945–1946	Served after being vice president
Henry A. Wallace	Secretary of Commerce	Franklin D. Roosevelt	1945–1946	Served after being vice president
Henry A. Wallace	Secretary of Commerce	Harry S. Truman	1945–1946	Served after being vice president
Dick Cheney	Chief of Staff	Gerald Ford	1975–1977	
Dick Cheney	Secretary of Defense	George H. W. Bush	1989–1993	

==== Ambassadors ====
Vice President	Position	President served under	Year(s) served	Notes
John Adams	Minister to the Netherlands	Continental Congress	1782–1788	
John Adams	Minister to Britain	Continental Congress	1785–1788	
Thomas Jefferson	Minister Plenipotentiary to France	Continental Congress	1785–1789	
Martin Van Buren	Minister to Britain	Andrew Jackson	1831–1832	
George M. Dallas	Minister to Russia	Martin Van Buren	1837–1839	
George M. Dallas	Minister to Britain	James Buchanan	1856–1861	Served after being vice president
William R. King	Minister to France	James K. Polk	1844–1846	
Hannibal Hamlin	Ambassador to Spain	James A. Garfield	1881–1883	Served after being vice president
Levi P. Morton	Minister Plenipotentiary to France	James A. Garfield	1881–1885	
Levi P. Morton	Minister Plenipotentiary to France	Chester A. Arthur	1881–1885	
Charles G. Dawes	United States Ambassador to Britain	Herbert Hoover	1929–1931	Served after being vice president
Walter Mondale	United States Ambassador to Japan	Bill Clinton	1993–1996	Served after being vice president
George H. W. Bush	Ambassador to the United Nations	Richard Nixon	1971–1973	
George H. W. Bush	Chief of the U.S. Liaison Office in Beijing	Gerald R. Ford	1974–1975	Head of U.S. mission in China

==== Other federal appointees ====
Vice President	Office	President appointed by	Year(s) served
Hannibal Hamlin	Collector of the Port of Boston	Andrew Johnson	1865–1866 (after vice presidency)
Chester A. Arthur	Collector of the Port of New York	Ulysses S. Grant	1871–1878
Adlai Stevenson I	First Assistant United States Postmaster General	Grover Cleveland	1885–1889
Theodore Roosevelt	Member, United States Civil Service Commission	Benjamin Harrison	1889–1895
Theodore Roosevelt	Assistant Secretary of the Navy	William McKinley	1897–1898
Thomas R. Marshall	Member, Lincoln Memorial Commission	Warren G. Harding	1921–1923 (after vice presidency)
Thomas R. Marshall	Chairman, Federal Coal Commission	Warren G. Harding	1922–1923 (after vice presidency)
Charles G. Dawes	Comptroller of the Currency	William McKinley; Theodore Roosevelt	1898–1901
Charles G. Dawes	Director of the Bureau of the Budget	Warren G. Harding	1921–1922
Nelson Rockefeller	Coordinator of Inter-American Affairs	Franklin D. Roosevelt	1940–1944
Nelson Rockefeller	Assistant Secretary of State for American Republic Affairs	Franklin D. Roosevelt	1944–1945
Nelson Rockefeller	Chairman of the International Development Advisory Board	Harry S. Truman	1950–1953
Nelson Rockefeller	Under Secretary of Health, Education and Welfare	Dwight D. Eisenhower	1953–1954
Nelson Rockefeller	Special Assistant to the President for Foreign Affairs	Dwight D. Eisenhower	1954–1956
George H. W. Bush	Director of Central Intelligence	Gerald Ford	1976–1977

=== Judicial branch ===
No vice presidents have yet served in the judicial branch.

=== Legislative branch ===
==== Senators ====
State	Vice President	Year(s) served	Notes
Alabama	William R. King	1819–1844	President pro tempore, 1836–1841
Alabama	William R. King	1848–1852	President pro tempore, 1850–1852. Resigned to become vice president
California	Richard Nixon	1950–1953	Resigned to become vice president
California	Kamala Harris	2017–2021	Resigned to become vice president
Delaware	Joe Biden	1973–2009	Resigned to become vice president
Indiana	Thomas A. Hendricks	1863–1869	
Indiana	Charles W. Fairbanks	1897–1905	Resigned to become vice president
Indiana	Dan Quayle	1981–1989	Resigned to become vice president
Kansas	Charles Curtis	1907–1913	President pro tempore, 1911
Kansas	Charles Curtis	1915–1929	Republican Whip, 1915–1924. Republican leader, 1924–1929. Resigned to become vice president.
Kentucky	Richard Mentor Johnson	1819–1829	
Kentucky	John C. Breckinridge	1861	Served after being vice president
Kentucky	Alben W. Barkley	1927–1949	Resigned to become vice president
Kentucky	Alben W. Barkley	1955–1956	Served after being vice president. Died in office
Maine	Hannibal Hamlin	1848–1861	Resigned to become vice president
Maine	Hannibal Hamlin	1869–1881	Served after being vice president
Massachusetts	Henry Wilson	1855–1873	Resigned to become vice president
Minnesota	Hubert Humphrey	1949–1964	Resigned to become vice president
Minnesota	Hubert Humphrey	1971–1978	Served after being vice president. Died in office
Minnesota	Walter Mondale	1964–1976	Resigned to become vice president
Missouri	Harry S. Truman	1935–1945	Resigned to become vice president
New York	Aaron Burr	1791–1797	
New York	Martin Van Buren	1821–1828	
Ohio	JD Vance	2023–2025	Resigned to become vice president
Pennsylvania	George M. Dallas	1831–1833	
South Carolina	John C. Calhoun	1832–1843	Served after being vice president
South Carolina	John C. Calhoun	1845–1850	Served after being vice president. Died in office
Tennessee	Andrew Johnson	1857–1862	
Tennessee	Andrew Johnson	1875	Served after being vice president. Died in office
Tennessee	Al Gore	1985–1993	Resigned to become vice president
Texas	Lyndon B. Johnson	1949–1961	Senate minority leader 1953–1955; Senate majority leader 1955–1961. Resigned to become vice president
Virginia	John Tyler	1827–1836	President pro tempore, 1835

A number of future and former vice presidents served together while in the Senate:

- King served with R. Johnson (1819–1829), Van Buren (1821–1828), Tyler (1827–1836), Dallas (1831–1833), Calhoun (1832–1843, 1848–1850) and Hamlin (1848–1852). Hamlin later served with Wilson (1855–1861; 1869–1873) and A. Johnson (1857–1861; 1875). Wilson and A. Johnson, during their continued service with each other (1861–1862), also served with Breckinridge (1861). Wilson also served with Hendricks (1863–1869).
- Curtis served with Barkley (1927–1929). Barkley later served with Truman (1935–1945), Humphrey (1955–1956) and L. Johnson (1955–1956). Humphrey and L. Johnson, who had served together before and after their service with Barkley (1949–1961), also served with Nixon (1950–1953). Humphrey would be succeeded by Mondale and would later serve with him (1971–1976) and Biden (1973–1978). Biden later served with Quayle (1981–1989) and Gore (1985–1993).

==== Representatives ====
State	Vice President	Year(s) served	Notes
California	Richard Nixon	1947–1950	
Illinois	Adlai Stevenson I	1875–1877	
Illinois	Adlai Stevenson I	1879–1881	
Indiana	Schuyler Colfax	1855–1869	Served as speaker of the House
Indiana	Thomas A. Hendricks	1851–1855	
Indiana	Dan Quayle	1977–1981	
Indiana	Mike Pence	2001–2013	
Kansas	Charles Curtis	1893–1907	
Kentucky	Richard M. Johnson	1806–1819	
Kentucky	Richard M. Johnson	1829–1837	
Kentucky	John C. Breckinridge	1851–1855	
Kentucky	Alben W. Barkley	1913–1927	
Maine	Hannibal Hamlin	1843–1847	
Massachusetts	Elbridge Gerry	1789–1793	
Michigan	Gerald Ford	1949–1973	House minority leader (1965–1973); resigned to become vice president
New York	Millard Fillmore	1833–1835	
New York	Millard Fillmore	1837–1843	
New York	William Wheeler	1861–1863	
New York	William Wheeler	1869–1877	
New York	Levi P. Morton	1879–1881	
New York	James S. Sherman	1887–1891	
New York	James S. Sherman	1893–1909	
North Carolina	William R. King	1811–1816	
South Carolina	John C. Calhoun	1811–1817	
Tennessee	Andrew Johnson	1843–1853	
Tennessee	Al Gore	1977–1985	
Texas	John Nance Garner	1903–1933	Served as speaker of the House
Texas	Lyndon B. Johnson	1937–1949	
Texas	George H. W. Bush	1967–1971	
Virginia	John Tyler	1816–1821	
Wyoming	Dick Cheney	1979–1989	Republican whip, 1989

A number of future vice presidents served in the House together:

- R. Johnson served with King (1811–1816), Calhoun (1811–1817), Tyler (1816–1819) and Fillmore (1833–1835).
- Hamlin served with A. Johnson (1843–1847). Breckinridge and Hendricks served together (1851–1855), as well as with A. Johnson (1851–1853).
- Colfax served with Wheeler (1861–1863). Wheeler later served with Stevenson (1875–1877). Stevenson later served with Morton (1879–1881).
- Sherman served with Curtis (1893–1907) and Garner (1903–1909). Garner later served with Barkley (1913–1927).
- Nixon served with L. Johnson (1947–1949) and Ford (1949–1950). Ford later served with Bush (1967–1971).
- Gore served with Quayle (1977–1981) and Cheney (1979–1985).

=== Continental Congress ===
Vice President	State	Year(s) served
John Adams	Massachusetts	1774–1778
Thomas Jefferson	Virginia	1775–1776; 1783–1784
Elbridge Gerry	Massachusetts	1776–1780

== State government ==
=== Governors ===
State	Vice President	Year(s) served	Notes
Indiana	Thomas A. Hendricks	1873–1877	
Indiana	Thomas R. Marshall	1909–1913	
Indiana	Mike Pence	2013–2017	Resigned to become vice president
Maine	Hannibal Hamlin	1857	
Massachusetts	Elbridge Gerry	1810–1812	
Massachusetts	Calvin Coolidge	1919–1921	
Maryland	Spiro Agnew	1967–1969	Resigned to become vice president
New York	George Clinton	1777–1795	
New York	George Clinton	1801–1804	
New York	Daniel D. Tompkins	1807–1817	Resigned to become vice president
New York	Martin Van Buren	1829	
New York	Levi P. Morton	1895–1896	Served after being vice president
New York	Theodore Roosevelt	1899–1900	
New York	Nelson Rockefeller	1959–1973	
Tennessee	Andrew Johnson	1853–1857	
Tennessee	Andrew Johnson	1862–1865	Military governor
Virginia	Thomas Jefferson	1779–1781	
Virginia	John Tyler	1825–1827	

=== State legislators ===
See below for information about pre-1776 colonial offices held.

State legislature	Vice President	Year(s)served	Notes
Indiana House of Representatives	Thomas A. Hendricks	1849	Speaker of the House 1849
Kentucky House of Representatives	Richard M. Johnson	1804–1806; 1819; 1841-1843 and 1850 (after vice presidency)	Only vice president to serve in a state legislature after his vice presidency. Died in office
Kentucky House of Representatives	John C. Breckinridge	1849–1851	
Maine House of Representatives	Hannibal Hamlin	1836–1841	Speaker of the House, 1837–1838, 1839–1840
Massachusetts House of Representatives	Henry Wilson	1841–1842	
Massachusetts House of Representatives	Calvin Coolidge	1907–1909	
Massachusetts Senate	Henry Wilson	1845–1847, 1851–1853	President of the Senate, 1851–1853
Massachusetts Senate	Calvin Coolidge	1912–1915	President of the Senate, 1914–1915
New York Senate	Martin Van Buren	1812–1820	
New York Senate	William A. Wheeler	1858–1859	
New Jersey General Assembly	Garret Hobart	1873–1876	Speaker of the House 1874
New Jersey Senate	Garret Hobart	1876–1882	President of the Senate 1881–1882
New York State Assembly	Aaron Burr	1784–1785	
New York State Assembly	Aaron Burr	1798–1799	
New York State Assembly	George Clinton	1800–1801	
New York State Assembly	Millard Fillmore	1829–1831	
New York State Assembly	William A. Wheeler	1850–1851	
New York State Assembly	Theodore Roosevelt	1882–1884	Minority leader 1883
Texas House of Representatives	John Nance Garner	1899–1903	
Tennessee House of Representatives	Andrew Johnson	1835–1837	
Tennessee Senate	Andrew Johnson	1841–1843	
Virginia House of Delegates	Thomas Jefferson	1776–1779	
Virginia House of Delegates	John Tyler	1811–1816	
Virginia House of Delegates	John Tyler	1823–1825	

=== Other statewide offices ===
Vice President	Office and jurisdiction	Year(s) served
Aaron Burr	Attorney General of New York	1789–1791
Martin Van Buren	Attorney General of New York	1815–1819
George M. Dallas	Attorney General of Pennsylvania	1833–1835
Millard Fillmore	New York State Comptroller	1848–1849
Calvin Coolidge	Lieutenant Governor of Massachusetts	1916–1919
Walter Mondale	Attorney General of Minnesota	1960–1964
Kamala Harris	Attorney General of California	2011–2017

== Local government ==
Vice President	Office and jurisdiction	Year(s) served
Martin Van Buren	Surrogate of Columbia County, New York	1808–1812
George M. Dallas	Mayor of Philadelphia, Pennsylvania	1828–1829
Andrew Johnson	Alderman, Greeneville, Tennessee	1828–1830
Andrew Johnson	Mayor of Greeneville, Tennessee	1830–1833
William A. Wheeler	District Attorney; Franklin County, New York	1846–1849
Adlai Stevenson I	State's Attorney; Woodford County, Illinois	1859–1869
James S. Sherman	Mayor of Utica, New York	1884–1885
Theodore Roosevelt	President of the New York Board of Police Commissioners	1895–1897
Calvin Coolidge	Mayor of Northampton, Massachusetts	1910–1911
John Nance Garner	County Judge of Uvalde County, Texas	1893–1896
Harry S. Truman	Eastern District Judge, Jackson County, Missouri	1923–1925
Harry S. Truman	Presiding Judge, Jackson County, Missouri	1927–1935
Alben W. Barkley	District Attorney of McCracken County, Kentucky	1906–1913
Hubert H. Humphrey	Mayor of Minneapolis, Minnesota	1945–1948
Spiro Agnew	Member, Baltimore County, Maryland Zoning Board of Appeals	1956–1960
Spiro Agnew	Chairman, Baltimore County, Maryland Zoning Board of Appeals	1958–1960
Spiro Agnew	County Executive, Baltimore County, Maryland	1962–1966
Joe Biden	Member of the New Castle County, Delaware County Council	1971–1973
Kamala Harris	District Attorney of San Francisco	2004–2011

== Foreign governments ==
=== Colonial, Confederate legislators, and Confederate Cabinet ===
Legislature	Vice President	Year(s) served	Notes
Confederate Cabinet	John C. Breckinridge	1865	Confederate States Secretary of War, served after being vice president
Confederate Congress	John Tyler	1861–1862	Under the Confederate States of America during the Civil War, served after being vice president and president.
Massachusetts House of Representatives	Elbridge Gerry	1772–1775	Under the Kingdom of Great Britain before 1776.
Massachusetts House of Representatives	John Adams	1768–1774	Under the Kingdom of Great Britain before 1776.
Virginia House of Burgesses	Thomas Jefferson	1769–1774	Under the Kingdom of Great Britain before 1776.

== Lost races ==
Other than immediate re-election to the vice presidency

Vice President	Office and jurisdiction	Year	Notes
John Adams	President of the United States	1800	Lost re-election to Thomas Jefferson
Thomas Jefferson	President of the United States	1796	Lost to John Adams. Elected president in 1800 and re-elected in 1804
Aaron Burr	Governor of New York	1804	Lost to Morgan Lewis
Elbridge Gerry	Governor of Massachusetts	1788; 1800; 1801; 1802; 1803; 1812	Lost to John Hancock in 1788 and Caleb Strong in 1800, 1801, 1802, 1803, and 1812. Won in 1810 and 1811
Daniel D. Tompkins	Governor of New York	1820	Lost to DeWitt Clinton. Won in 1807, 1810, 1813, and 1816.
Martin Van Buren	President of the United States	1840; 1848	Lost re-election to William Henry Harrison in 1840. Ran on Free Soil Ticket 1848; came in third place behind Zachary Taylor and Lewis Cass
Martin Van Buren	Democratic nomination for President of the United States	1844	Placed in distant third behind James K. Polk and Lewis Cass
Richard Mentor Johnson	United States Senator from Kentucky	1842	Lost to John J. Crittenden
Richard Mentor Johnson	Democratic nomination for President of the United States	1844	Lost to James K. Polk
John Tyler	Vice President of the United States	1836	Lost to Richard Mentor Johnson. Later won in 1840.
George M. Dallas	Democratic nomination for President of the United States	1848	Lost to Lewis Cass
Millard Fillmore	United States Senator from New York	1843	Lost to Silas Wright
Millard Fillmore	Governor of New York	1844	Lost to Silas Wright
Millard Fillmore	Whig nomination for Vice President of the United States	1844	Lost to Theodore Frelinghuysen. Later won in 1848.
Millard Fillmore	Whig nomination for President of the United States	1852	Lost to Winfield Scott
Millard Fillmore	President of the United States	1856	Ran on Whig and Know-Nothing tickets 1856; came in third place behind James Buchanan and John C. Fremont
John C. Breckinridge	President of the United States	1860	Ran as Southern Democrat 1860; lost to Abraham Lincoln
Andrew Johnson	Democratic nomination for President of the United States	1860; 1868	Lost to Stephen A. Douglas in 1860 and Horatio Seymour in 1868
Andrew Johnson	United States Senator from Tennessee	1869	Lost to Henry Cooper
Andrew Johnson	United States Representative	1872	Came in third behind Horace Maynard and Benjamin F. Cheatham
Henry Wilson	Republican nomination for Vice President of the United States	1868	Lost to Schuyler Colfax. Later won in 1872.
William A. Wheeler	Republican nomination for President of the United States	1876	Lost to Rutherford B. Hayes. Later made Hayes' running mate and elected vice president
Thomas A. Hendricks	Governor of Indiana	1860; 1868	Lost to Henry S. Lane in 1860 and Conrad Baker in 1868. Later elected in 1872
Thomas A. Hendricks	Democratic nomination for President of the United States	1876, 1880, 1884	Lost to Samuel J. Tilden in 1876, Winfield Scott Hancock in 1880 and Grover Cleveland in 1884. Later made Tilden's running mate in 1876 and Cleveland's running mate in 1884
Thomas A. Hendricks	Vice President of the United States	1876	Lost to William A. Wheeler. Later elected in 1884
Levi P. Morton	Republican nomination for President of the United States	1896	Lost to William McKinley
Adlai Stevenson	Vice President of the United States	1900	Lost to Theodore Roosevelt
Adlai Stevenson	Governor of Illinois	1908	Lost to Charles S. Deneen
Garret Hobart	United States Senator from New Jersey	1883	Lost to John R. McPherson. At the time Senators were chosen by the state legislature.
Theodore Roosevelt	Mayor of New York City	1886	Placed in distant third behind Abram S. Hewitt and Henry George
Theodore Roosevelt	Republican nomination for President of the United States	1912	Lost to William Howard Taft
Theodore Roosevelt	President of the United States	1912	Placed distant second to Woodrow Wilson. Candidate of the Progressive Party. Only third-party candidate to place second in an election.
Charles W. Fairbanks	United States Senator from Indiana	1893	Lost to David Turpie. At the time Senators were chosen by the state legislature. Later elected in 1897.
Charles W. Fairbanks	Republican nomination for President of the United States	1908, 1916	Lost to William Howard Taft in 1908 and Charles Evans Hughes in 1916. Later made Hughes's running mate.
Charles W. Fairbanks	Vice President of the United States	1916	Lost to Thomas R. Marshall
Thomas R. Marshall	Democratic nomination for President of the United States	1912	Lost to Woodrow Wilson. Later made Wilson's running mate and elected vice president
Charles G. Dawes	United States Senator from Illinois	1902	Lost to Albert J. Hopkins. At the time Senators were chosen by the state legislature
Charles Curtis	Republican nomination for President of the United States	1928	Lost to Herbert Hoover. Later chosen as Hoover's running mate and elected vice president
John Nance Garner	Democratic nomination for President of the United States	1932, 1940	Lost to Franklin D. Roosevelt both times. In 1932, he was made Roosevelt's running mate and elected vice president.
Henry A. Wallace	President of the United States	1948	Ran on the Progressive Party ticket 1948. Came in fourth behind Harry S. Truman, Thomas E. Dewey, and Strom Thurmond.
Alben W. Barkley	Democratic nomination for President of the United States	1952	Lost to Adlai Stevenson II
Richard Nixon	President of the United States	1960	Lost to John F. Kennedy. Elected president in 1968 and re-elected in 1972
Richard Nixon	Governor of California	1962	Lost to Pat Brown by nearly 300,000 votes; in his concession speech, he lashed out at the media, saying "...you don't have Nixon to kick around any more, because, gentlemen, this is my last press conference."
Lyndon B. Johnson	United States Senator from Texas	1941	Lost to W. Lee O'Daniel. Later elected Senator in 1948
Lyndon B. Johnson	Democratic nomination for President of the United States	1960	Placed second to John F. Kennedy after failing to contest any state primaries. Later chosen as Kennedy's running mate and elected vice president. He assumed the presidency upon Kennedy's assassination in 1963. He subsequently won the Democratic nomination and elected president to a full term in 1964. He initially ran for re-election to a second full term in 1968 but ultimately withdrew from the race.
Hubert Humphrey	Democratic nomination for Vice President of the United States	1956	Lost to Estes Kefauver. Later won in 1964.
Hubert Humphrey	Democratic nomination for President of the United States	1960 1972	Lost to John F. Kennedy in 1960 and George McGovern in 1972. Won the Democratic Party's presidential nomination in 1968 following Johnson's withdrawal.
Hubert Humphrey	President of the United States	1968	Lost to Richard Nixon.
Spiro Agnew	Maryland Circuit Court Judge	1960	
Gerald Ford	President of the United States	1976	Lost to Jimmy Carter
Nelson Rockefeller	Republican nomination for President of the United States	1960, 1964, 1968	Lost to Richard Nixon in 1960 and 1968 and Barry Goldwater in 1964
Walter Mondale	President of the United States	1984	Lost to Ronald Reagan.
Walter Mondale	United States Senator from Minnesota	2002	Replaced Senator Paul Wellstone on the ballot after his death in a plane crash. Lost to Norm Coleman
George H. W. Bush	United States Senator from Texas	1964; 1970	Lost to Ralph Yarborough in 1964 and Lloyd Bentsen in 1970
George H. W. Bush	Republican nomination for President of the United States	1980	Lost to Ronald Reagan. Later chosen as Reagan's running mate and elected vice president. Elected president in 1988 but lost re-election in 1992 to Bill Clinton
George H. W. Bush	President of the United States	1992	Lost re-election to Bill Clinton
Dan Quayle	Republican nomination for President of the United States	2000	Lost to George W. Bush
Albert A. Gore	Democratic nomination for President of the United States	1988	Lost to Michael Dukakis. Later won Democratic nomination in 2000.
Albert A. Gore	President of the United States	2000	Lost to George W. Bush
Joe Biden	Democratic nomination for President of the United States	1988, 2008	Lost to Michael Dukakis in 1988 and Barack Obama in 2008. Later chosen as Obama's running mate in 2008 and elected vice president. Elected president in 2020. He initially ran for re-election to a second term in 2024 but ultimately withdrew from the race.
Mike Pence	United States Representative	1988; 1990	Lost to Philip Sharp both times. Later elected in 2000, 2002, 2004, 2006, 2008, and 2010.
Mike Pence	Republican nomination for President of the United States	2024	Lost to Donald Trump
Kamala Harris	Democratic nomination for President of the United States	2020	Lost to Joe Biden. Later chosen as Biden's running mate in 2020 and elected vice president. Won the Democratic Party's presidential nomination in 2024 following Biden's withdrawal.
Kamala Harris	President of the United States	2024	Lost to Donald Trump

== See also ==
- List of presidents of the United States by other offices held
