= List of presidents of the United States by previous experience =

Although many paths may lead to the presidency of the United States, the most common job experience, occupation or profession of U.S. presidents has been that of a lawyer. This sortable table enumerates all holders of that office, along with major elective or appointive offices or periods of military service prior to election to the presidency. The column immediately to the right of the presidents' names shows the position or office held just before the presidency. The next column to the right lists the next previous position held, and so on. Note that the total number of previous positions held by an individual may exceed four; the number of columns was limited to what would fit within the page width. The last two columns on the right list the home state (at the time of election to the presidency) and primary occupation of each future president, prior to beginning a political career.

== By the numbers ==
Of the 45 (Note: There have been 47 presidencies, as Grover Cleveland and Donald Trump served nonconsecutive terms.) different people who have been or are currently serving as president:

- 31 presidents had previous military experience; 9 were generals in the US Army. (Note: George Washington was commanding general of the Continental Army, the pre-independence equivalent of the US Army. The 9 US Army generals were Jackson, W. H. Harrison, Taylor, Pierce, Grant, Hayes, Garfield, B. Harrison and Eisenhower. Others with military experience were Jefferson, Monroe, Madison, Tyler, Polk, Fillmore, Buchanan, Lincoln, A. Johnson, Arthur, McKinley, T. Roosevelt, Truman, Kennedy, L. B. Johnson, Nixon, Carter, Ford, Reagan, G. H. W. Bush, and G. W. Bush.)
- 27 presidents were previously lawyers.
- 20 presidents previously served as governors; 17 presidents were state governors; 9 were governors immediately before election as presidents. Two, William Henry Harrison and William Howard Taft, served as territorial governors. One, Andrew Jackson, served as a military governor of a territory (Florida) before it became a state. Andrew Johnson served as a military governor of Tennessee during the Civil War.
- 18 presidents previously served as U.S. representatives; 6 of 18 held this office prior to the four 'previous positions' shown in this table. Only one – James A. Garfield – was a representative immediately before election as president. Only Garfield and Abraham Lincoln had served in no higher office than representative when elected president. Only John Quincy Adams served as a U.S. representative after being president. Additionally, after being president, John Tyler served in the Provisional Confederate Congress and was later elected to the Confederate House of Representatives, but he died before taking his seat.
- 17 presidents previously served as U.S. senators; only 3 immediately before election as president. Only one president, Andrew Johnson, served as a U.S. senator after his presidency.
- 15 presidents previously served as vice presidents. All except Richard Nixon and Joe Biden were vice presidents immediately before becoming president. 9 of the 15 succeeded to the presidency upon the death or (in one case) resignation of the elected president; 5 of those 9 were not later elected. One, Gerald Ford, was appointed to the vice presidency, succeeded to the presidency, and then failed to win the next election, making him the only president who had never been elected as president or vice president.
- 9 presidents were out of office (for at least one year) immediately before election as president.
- 8 presidents previously served as Cabinet secretaries; 6 as secretary of state; 5 of the 8 served immediately before election as president.
- 7 presidents had previous experience in foreign service. (Note: Martin van Buren's brief foreign service is not counted since, although he was appointed Ambassador to the United Kingdom, the appointment was rejected by the U.S. Senate)
- 5 presidents had never been elected to public office before becoming president: Zachary Taylor, Ulysses S. Grant, Herbert Hoover, Dwight D. Eisenhower, and Donald Trump. Most of these had, however, been appointed to several prominent offices. Hoover's contributions to the Treaty of Versailles preceded his appointment as United States Secretary of Commerce. Taylor, Grant, and Eisenhower led U.S. forces to victory in the Mexican–American War, American Civil War, and World War II, respectively – each occupying the highest-ranking command post of their time. Trump is the group's sole exception, having never held any public office nor any military position.
- 5 presidents previously taught at a university: James A. Garfield, William Howard Taft, Woodrow Wilson, Bill Clinton, and Barack Obama.
- 3 presidents previously served as city mayors: Andrew Johnson, Grover Cleveland, and Calvin Coolidge were mayors of Greeneville, Tennessee, Buffalo, New York, and Northampton, Massachusetts, respectively.
- 2 presidents served as president of the United States for two non-consecutive terms, Grover Cleveland and Donald Trump.
- 2 presidents previously served as party leaders of the House of Representatives, James A. Garfield and Gerald Ford.
- 1 president previously served as an ordained minister, serving as a pastor in the Disciples of Christ (Christian) Church, James A. Garfield.
- 1 president previously served as speaker of the House of Representatives, James K. Polk.
- 1 president previously served as president pro tempore of the United States Senate, John Tyler.
- 1 president previously served as party leader of the United States Senate, Lyndon B. Johnson.
- 1 president had previously earned a PhD, Woodrow Wilson.

== List ==
President		Previous 1	Previous 2	Previous 3	Previous 4	Occupation	State (Note: "State" refers to the state generally considered "home", not necessarily the state where the president was born)
1	George Washington	Out of office (Note: This designation is used whenever the subject was out of public office for more than one year)	Constitutional Convention (Note: Washington was first chosen by the Virginia State Legislature to be a delegate to the Constitutional Convention. Then he was elected by the delegates to be president of the convention.)	Out of office	Military (Note: Commander-in-chief of the Continental Army during the American Revolutionary War)	Planter, land surveyor	Virginia
2	John Adams	Vice President	Foreign service (Note: This is a general designation for any appointive position representing the United States to a foreign government)	Continental Congress	State legislator (Note: This is a general designation for any elected state legislator)	Lawyer, farmer	Massachusetts
3	Thomas Jefferson	Vice President	Secretary of State	Foreign service	Congressman	Planter, lawyer, land surveyor, architect	Virginia
4	James Madison	Secretary of State	U.S. representative	Constitutional Convention	State legislator	Planter	Virginia
5	James Monroe	Secretary of State	Foreign service	State governor	U.S. senator	Planter, lawyer	Virginia
6	John Quincy Adams	Secretary of State	Foreign service	U.S. senator	State legislator	Lawyer	Massachusetts
7	Andrew Jackson	Out of office	U.S. senator	Military	U.S. senator	Lawyer, military officer	Tennessee
8	Martin Van Buren	Vice President	Secretary of State	State governor (Note: Van Buren served just over two months of his term as governor of New York before President Jackson appointed him Secretary of State)	U.S. senator	Lawyer	New York
9	William Henry Harrison	Out of office	Foreign service	U.S. senator/U.S. representative	Territorial governor	Military	Ohio
10	John Tyler	Vice President (Note: Tyler succeeded President Harrison, who died in office. He was not elected.)	U.S. senator	State governor	U.S. representative	Lawyer	Virginia
11	James K. Polk	Out of office	State governor	Speaker of the House	U.S. representative	Lawyer, planter	Tennessee
12	Zachary Taylor	Military	—	—	—	Military	Kentucky
13	Millard Fillmore	Vice President (Note: Fillmore succeeded President Taylor, who died in office. He was not elected.)	State office	Out of office	U.S. representative	Lawyer	New York
14	Franklin Pierce	Out of office	Military	U.S. senator	U.S. representative	Lawyer	New Hampshire
15	James Buchanan	Foreign service	Out of office	Secretary of State	U.S. senator	Lawyer	Pennsylvania
16	Abraham Lincoln	Out of office	U.S. representative	State legislator	Military	Lawyer, land surveyor	Illinois (Note: Lincoln was born in Kentucky, but moved to Indiana, then Illinois at an early age)
17	Andrew Johnson	Vice President (Note: Johnson succeeded President Lincoln, who was assassinated. He was not elected.)	Military governor (Note: President Lincoln appointed Johnson military governor of Tennessee during the Civil War)	U.S. senator	State governor	Tailor	Tennessee
18	Ulysses S. Grant	Military	—	—	—	Military	Illinois (Note: Grant was born and raised in Ohio. He rose to prominence as a Civil War general from Illinois and Illinois was his residence for his political career.)
19	Rutherford B. Hayes	State governor	Out of office	State governor	U.S. representative	Lawyer	Ohio
20	James A. Garfield	U.S. representative	Military	State legislator	—	Ordained minister, lawyer, teacher	Ohio
21	Chester A. Arthur	Vice President (Note: Arthur succeeded President Garfield, who was assassinated. He was not elected.)	Out of office	Federal office (Note: This is a general designation for appointive domestic Federal offices below cabinet level)	Out of office	Lawyer, teacher, tariff collector	New York
22	Grover Cleveland	State governor	Local office (Note: This is a general designation for local elective offices)	—	—	Lawyer	New York
23	Benjamin Harrison	Out of office	U.S. senator	Out of office	Military	Court reporter	Indiana
24	Grover Cleveland	Out of office	President	State governor	Local office	Lawyer	New York
25	William McKinley	State governor	U.S. representative	Military	—	Lawyer	Ohio
26	Theodore Roosevelt	Vice President (Note: Roosevelt succeeded President McKinley, who was assassinated. He was elected to a full term in 1904, chose not to run again in 1908, and ran unsuccessfully in 1912.)	State governor	Military	Federal office (Note: Assistant Secretary of the Navy)	Historian, public servant, naturalist, military officer, policeman, rancher	New York
27	William Howard Taft	Secretary of War	Territorial governor (Note: President McKinley appointed Taft governor-General of the Philippines)	Judicial (Note: United States Court of Appeals for the Sixth Circuit)	Federal office (Note: Solicitor General of the United States)	Lawyer, dean	Ohio
28	Woodrow Wilson	State governor	—	—	—	Academic (Note: Wilson served as president of Princeton University from 1902 to 1910)	New Jersey
29	Warren G. Harding	U.S. Senator	Out of office	State legislator	—	Journalist, publisher	Ohio
30	Calvin Coolidge	Vice President (Note: Coolidge succeeded President Harding, who died in office. He was elected to a full term in 1924, chose not to run again in 1928.)	State governor	State office	State legislator	Lawyer	Massachusetts (Note: Born and raised in Vermont, Coolidge permanently moved to Massachusetts to attend college.)
31	Herbert Hoover	Secretary of Commerce	Out of office (Note: Following World War I, Hoover was involved with several humanitarian organizations.)	Federal office (Note: Director of United States Food Administration)	—	Businessman, mining engineer	California
32	Franklin D. Roosevelt	State governor	Out of office	Federal office	State legislator	Lawyer	New York
33	Harry S. Truman	Vice President (Note: Truman succeeded President Roosevelt, who died in office. He was elected to a full term in 1948, chose not to run again in 1952.)	U.S. senator	County commissioner (county court)	Military	Farmer	Missouri
34	Dwight D. Eisenhower	Military	—	—	—	Military officer, President of Columbia University	Kansas
35	John F. Kennedy	U.S. senator	U.S. representative	Military	—	Journalist, naval officer	Massachusetts
36	Lyndon B. Johnson	Vice President (Note: Johnson succeeded President Kennedy, who was assassinated. He was elected to a full term in 1964, chose not to run again in 1968.)	U.S. senator	U.S. representative	Federal office (Note: head of the National Youth Administration in Texas)	Teacher, naval officer, rancher	Texas
37	Richard Nixon	Out of office	Vice President	U.S. senator	U.S. representative	Lawyer, naval officer	California
38	Gerald Ford	Vice President (Note: Ford succeeded President Nixon, who resigned. He lost election in 1976. Previously, Ford was appointed vice president after Spiro Agnew resigned. Currently, only president not to have been elected to the executive branch.)	U.S. representative	Military	—	Lawyer, naval officer	Michigan (Note: Ford was born in Nebraska, but moved to Michigan at an early age)
39	Jimmy Carter	Out of office	State governor	State legislator	Military	Farmer, naval officer	Georgia
40	Ronald Reagan	Out of office	State governor	—	Military	Actor, Screen Actors Guild president	California (Note: Reagan was born, raised, and educated in Illinois; he moved permanently to California after graduation from college.)
41	George H. W. Bush	Vice President	Out of office	Federal office (Note: Director of the Central Intelligence Agency)	Foreign service	Businessman, naval aviator	Texas (Note: Bush was born in Massachusetts, and raised in Connecticut, but moved to Texas after graduation from college.)
42	Bill Clinton	State governor	State attorney general	—	—	Lawyer, law professor at the University of Arkansas	Arkansas
43	George W. Bush	State governor	Out of office	Military	—	Businessman, Air National Guard pilot	Texas
44	Barack Obama	U.S. senator	State legislator	—	—	Lawyer, law professor at the University of Chicago (Note: Obama taught constitutional law at the University of Chicago Law School from 1992 to 2004)	Illinois (Note: Obama was born in Hawaii and mostly raised there. His career was based in Illinois.)
45	Donald Trump	—	—	—	—	Businessman, real estate developer, reality television personality	New York (Note: Trump, who was born in New York, ran for office in 2016 from there, but moved his official residence to Mar-a-Lago in Florida during his term.)
46	Joe Biden	Out of office	Vice President	U.S. senator	Local office	Lawyer	Delaware
47	Donald Trump	Out of office	President	—	—	Businessman, real estate developer, reality television personality	Florida

== See also ==
- List of presidents of the United States by other offices held
- List of vice presidents of the United States by previous experience
