= List of United States National Republican and Whig Party presidential tickets =

This is a list of the candidates for the offices of President of the United States and Vice President of the United States of the defunct National Republican Party and the defunct Whig Party. The Whigs were not a direct continuation of the National Republican Party, but most former National Republicans did join the Whigs in the 1830s. Opponents who received over one percent of the popular vote or ran an official campaign that received Electoral College votes are listed. Offices held prior to Election Day are included, and those held on Election Day have an italicized end date.

== National Republican Party ticket (1828–1832) ==
=== 1828 ===
Presidential nominee	1828 (lost)		Vice presidential nominee
John Quincy Adams of MA (1767–1848)	Prior public experience: U.S. Ambassador to the Netherlands (1794–1797); U.S. Ambassador to Prussia (1797–1801); Massachusetts Senate (1802–1803); U.S. Senate (1803–1808); U.S. Ambassador to Russia (1809–1814); U.S. Ambassador to United Kingdom (1815–1817); U.S. Secretary of State (1817–1825); President (1825–1829); Higher education: Leiden University (attended); Harvard University (BA, MA)	Prior public experience: Attorney General of Pennsylvania (1811); U.S. Attorney General (1814–1817); Acting U.S. Secretary of State (1817); U.S. Ambassador to the United Kingdom (1818–1825); U.S. Secretary of the Treasury (1825–1829); Higher education: Princeton University (BA)	Richard Rush of PA (1780–1859)
Opponent(s); Andrew Jackson (Democratic)	Electoral vote (President): Jackson: 178 (68.2%); Adams: 83 (31.8%); Electoral vote (Vice President): Calhoun: 171 (65.5%); Rush: 83 (31.8%); Smith: 7 (2.7%); Popular vote: Jackson/Calhoun: 642,553 (55.9%); Adams/Rush: 500,897 (43.7%)		Opponent(s); John C. Calhoun (Democratic)

=== 1832 ===
Presidential nominee	1832 (lost)		Vice presidential nominee
Henry Clay of KY (1777–1852)	Prior public experience: Kentucky House of Representatives (1803–1805, 1808–1809); Speaker of the Kentucky House of Representatives (1809); United States Senate (1806–1807, 1810–1811, 1831–1842); U.S. House of Representatives (1811–1814, 1815–1821, 1823–1825); Speaker of the U.S. House of Representatives (1811–1814, 1815–1820, 1823–1825); U.S. Secretary of State (1825–1829); Higher education: College of William and Mary (attended)	Prior public experience: Pennsylvania House of Representatives (1808–1810); U.S. House of Representatives (1815–1823, 1827–1829); Chair of the House Judiciary Committee (1819–1822); Higher education: University of Pennsylvania (attended); Princeton University (BA)	John Sergeant of PA (1779–1852)
Opponent(s); Andrew Jackson (Democratic); William Wirt (Anti-Masonic)	Electoral vote (President): Jackson: 219 (76.0%); Clay: 49 (17.0%); Floyd: 11 (3.8%); Wirt: 7 (2.4%); None: 2 (0.7%); Electoral vote (Vice President): Van Buren: 189 (65.6%); Sargent: 49 (17.0%); Wilkins: 30 (10.4%); Lee: 11 (3.8%); Ellmaker: 7 (2.4%); None: 2 (0.7%); Popular vote: Jackson/Van Buren: 701,780 (54.7%); Clay/Sargent: 484,205 (36.9%); Wirt/Ellmaker: 100,715 (7.8%)		Opponent(s); Martin Van Buren (Democratic); Amos Ellmaker (Anti-Masonic)

== Whig Party tickets (1836–1852) ==
=== 1836 ===
The Whig Party ran regional candidates in 1836. William Henry Harrison and Francis Granger ran in Northern states, while Hugh Lawson White and John Tyler ran in Southern states. Daniel Webster was on the ballot in Massachusetts and Willie Person Mangum received votes from the Electoral College without being on the ballot.

Presidential nominee	1836 (lost)		Vice presidential nominee
Northern states: William Henry Harrison of OH (1773–1841)	Prior public experience: Secretary of the Northwest Territory (1798–1799); U.S. House of Representatives (1799–1800, 1816–1819); Governor of Indiana (1800–1812); Governor of the District of Louisiana (1804–1805); Ohio Senate (1819–1821); U.S. Senate (1825–1828); Chair of the Senate Military Affairs Committee (1825–1828); U.S. Minister to Gran Colombia (1829); Higher education: Hampden-Sydney College (attended); University of Pennsylvania (attended)	Prior public experience: New York Assembly (1826–1828, 1830–1832); U.S. House of Representatives (1835–1837); Higher education: Yale University (BA)	Northern states: Francis Granger of NY (1792–1868)
Southern states: Hugh White of TN (1773–1840)	Prior public experience: Tennessee Senate (1807–1808, 1817–1825); U.S. Attorney for the Eastern District of Tennessee (1808–1809); Justice of the Tennessee Supreme Court (1809–1815); U.S. Senate (1825–1840); Chair of the Senate Indian Affairs Committee (1828–1832, 1833–1840); President pro tempore of the U.S. Senate (1832–1833); Higher education: None	Prior public experience: Virginia House of Delegates (1811–1816, 1823–1825); U.S. House of Representatives (1816–1821); Governor of Virginia (1825–1827); U.S. Senate (1827–1836); Chair of the Senate Manufactures Committee (1833–1835); President pro tempore of the U.S. Senate (1935); Chair of the Senate District of Columbia Committee (1835–1836); Higher education: College of William and Mary (BA)	Southern states: John Tyler of VA (1790–1862)
Opponent(s); Martin Van Buren (Democratic)	Electoral vote (President): Van Buren: 170 (57.8%); Harrison: 73 (24.8%); White: 26 (8.8%); Webster: 14 (4.8%); Magnum: 11 (3.7%); Contingent vote (Vice President): Johnson 33 (63.5%); Granger: 16 (30.8%); Blank: 3 (5.8%); Electoral vote (Vice President): Johnson 147 (50.0%); Granger: 77 (26.2%); Tyler: 47 (16.0%); Smith: 23 (7.8%); Popular vote: Van Buren/Johnson: 764,176 (50.8%); Harrison/Granger: 550,816 (36.6%); White/Tyler: 146,109 (9.7%); Webster/Granger: 41,201 (2.7%)		Opponent(s); Richard Johnson (Democratic)

=== 1840 ===
Presidential nominee	1840 (won)		Vice presidential nominee
William Henry Harrison of OH (1773–1841)	Prior public experience: Secretary of the Northwest Territory (1798–1799); U.S. House of Representatives (1799–1800, 1816–1819); Governor of Indiana (1800–1812); Governor of the District of Louisiana (1804–1805); Ohio Senate (1819–1821); U.S. Senate (1825–1828); Chair of the Senate Military Affairs Committee (1825–1828); U.S. Minister to Gran Colombia (1829); Higher education: Hampden-Sydney College (attended); University of Pennsylvania (attended)	Prior public experience: Virginia House of Delegates (1811–1816, 1823–1825); U.S. House of Representatives (1816–1821); Governor of Virginia (1825–1827); U.S. Senate (1827–1836); Chair of the Senate Manufactures Committee (1833–1835); President pro tempore of the U.S. Senate (1935); Chair of the Senate District of Columbia Committee (1835–1836); Higher education: College of William and Mary (BA)	John Tyler of VA (1790–1862)
Opponent(s); Martin Van Buren (Democratic)	Electoral vote: Harrison/Tyler: 234 (79.6%); Van Buren/Johnson: 60 (20.4%); Popular vote: Harrison/Tyler: 1,275,390 (52.9%); Van Buren/Johnson: 1,128,854 (46.8%)		Opponent(s); Richard Johnson (Democratic)

=== 1844 ===
Presidential nominee	1844 (lost)		Vice presidential nominee
Henry Clay of KY (1777–1852)	Prior public experience: Kentucky House of Representatives (1803–1805, 1808–1809); Speaker of the Kentucky House of Representatives (1809); United States Senate (1806–1807, 1810–1811, 1831–1842); Chair of the Senate Foreign Relations Committee (1834–1836); Chair of the Senate Finance Committee (1841); U.S. House of Representatives (1811–1814, 1815–1821, 1823–1825); Speaker of the U.S. House of Representatives (1811–1814, 1815–1820, 1823–1825); U.S. Secretary of State (1825–1829); Higher education: College of William and Mary (attended)	Prior public experience: New Jersey Attorney General (1817–1829); U.S. Senate (1829–1835); Chair of the Senate Manufactures Committee (1834–1835); Mayor of Newark, NJ (1837–1838); Higher education: Princeton University (BA)	Theodore Frelinghuysen of NJ (1787–1862)
Opponent(s); James Polk (Democratic); James Birney (Liberty)	Electoral vote: Polk/Dallas: 170 (61.8%); Clay/Frelinghuysen: 105 (38.2%); Popular vote: Polk/Dallas: 1,339,494 (49.5%); Clay/Frelinghuysen: 1,300,004 (49.1%); Birney/Morris: 62,103 (2.3%)		Opponent(s); George Dallas (Democratic); Thomas Morris (Liberty)

=== 1848 ===
Presidential nominee	1848 (won)		Vice presidential nominee
Zachary Taylor of LA (1784–1850)	Prior public experience: None; Higher education: None	Prior public experience: New York Assembly (1829–1831); U.S. House of Representatives (1833–1835, 1837–1843); Chair of the House Ways and Means Committee (1841–1843); Comptroller of New York (1848–1849); Higher education: None	Millard Fillmore of NY (1800–1874)
Opponent(s); Lewis Cass (Democratic); Martin Van Buren (Free Soil)	Electoral vote: Taylor/Fillmore: 163 (56.2%); Cass/Butler: 127 (43.8%); Popular vote: Taylor/Fillmore: 1,361,393 (47.1%); Cass/Butler: 1,223,460 (42.5%); Van Buren/Adams 291,501 (10.1%)		Opponent(s); William Butler (Democratic); Charles Adams (Free Soil)

=== 1852 ===
Presidential nominee	1852 (lost)		Vice presidential nominee
Winfield Scott of NJ (1786–1866)	Prior public experience: Commanding General of the U.S. Army (1841–1861); Higher education: College of William and Mary (attended)	Prior public experience: North Carolina House of Representatives (1833–1840); Speaker of the North Carolina House of Representatives (1838–1840); U.S. Senate (1840–1843); Chair of the Senate Claims Committee (1841–1843); Governor of North Carolina (1845–1849); U.S. Secretary of the Navy (1850–1852); Higher education: University of North Carolina, Chapel Hill (BA)	William Graham of NC (1804–1875)
Opponent(s); Franklin Pierce (Democratic); John Hale (Free Soil)	Electoral vote: Pierce/King: 254 (85.8%); Scott/Graham: 42 (14.2%); Popular vote: Pierce/King: 1,607,510 (50.8%); Scott/Graham: 1,386,942 (43.9%); Hale/Julian: 155,210 (4.9%)		Opponent(s); William King (Democratic); George Julian (Free Soil)

== Whig Party and American Party ticket (1856) ==
The collapse of the Whigs after 1852 left political chaos. Even though the party disintegrated, it continued to win some elections under its own banner, as the "Opposition Party", or as the American Party. The American, or "Know-Nothing" Party, formed from various prohibitionist and nativist movements, based originally on the secret Know-Nothing lodges. It was a moralistic party that appealed to the middle class fear of corruption, which it identified with Catholics, especially the recent Irish immigrants who seemed to bring crime, corruption, poverty and bossism as soon as they arrived. Remnants of the Whig party met once more in convention in 1856, and nominated the Know Nothing's nominees. While the Democratic ticket was focused in the South, and the Republican ticket in the North, the Know-Nothing ticket was on the ballot all across the country, providing alternatives to James Buchanan and John C. Frémont in every state which had a popular vote.

Presidential nominee	1856 (lost)		Vice presidential nominee
Millard Fillmore of NY (1800–1874)	Prior public experience: New York Assembly (1829–1831); U.S. House of Representatives (1833–1835, 1837–1843); Chair of the House Ways and Means Committee (1841–1843); Comptroller of New York (1848–1849); Vice President (1849–1850); President (1850–1853); Higher education: None	Prior public experience: Acting U.S. Minister to Texas (1844–1845); U.S. Minister to Prussia (1846–1849); Higher education: University of Nashville (attended); United States Military Academy (BS); Transylvania University (attended)	Andrew Donelson of TN (1799–1871)
Opponent(s); James Buchanan (Democratic); John Frémont (Republican)	Electoral vote: Buchanan/Breckinridge: 174 (58.8%); Frémont/Dayton: 114 (38.5%); Fillmore/Donelson: 8 (2.7%); Popular vote: Buchanan/Breckinridge: 1,836,072 (45.3%); Frémont/Dayton: 1,342,345 (33.1%); Fillmore/Donelson: 873,053 (21.5%)		Opponent(s); John Breckinridge (Democratic); William Dayton (Republican)

== Constitutional Union Party ticket (1860) ==
The Republican Party was more driven, in terms of ideology and talent; it surpassed the hapless Whig/American Party coalition in 1856. By 1858 the Republicans controlled majorities in every Northern state, and hence controlled the electoral votes for president in 1860. The tattered remnants of the Coalition's southern wing, under the name, "Constitutional Union Party", ran a ticket in order to prevent secession. They were joined by a few anti-secessionist Southern Democrats. Nearly all of the Northern wing had already joined the Republicans; the only free states where the Constitutional Union Party garnered more than 3% were Massachusetts and California.

Presidential nominee	1860 (lost)		Vice presidential nominee
John Bell of TN (1796–1869)	Prior public experience: Tennessee Senate (1817); U.S. House of Representatives (1827–1841); Chair of the House Indian Affairs Committee (1829–1832, 1835–1841); Chair of the House Judiciary Committee (1832–1834); Speaker of the U.S. House of Representatives (1834–1835); U.S. Secretary of War (1841); Tennessee House of Representatives (1847); U.S. Senate (1847–1859); Higher education: University of Nashville (BA)	Prior public experience: U.S. House of Representatives (1825–1835); Chair of the House Foreign Affairs Committee (1827–1829); Governor of Massachusetts (1836–1840); U.S. Minister to Great Britain (1841–1845); U.S. Secretary of State (1852–1853); U.S. Senate (1853–1854); Higher education: Harvard University (BA, MA); University of Göttingen (PhD)	Edward Everett of MA (1794–1865)
Opponent(s); Abraham Lincoln (Republican); Stephen Douglas (Democratic); John Breckinridge (Southern Democrats)	Electoral vote: Lincoln/Hamlin: 180 (59.4%); Breckinridge/Lane: 72 (23.8%); Bell/Everett: 39 (12.9%); Douglas/Johnson: 12 (4.0%); Popular vote: Lincoln/Hamlin: 1,865,908 (39.7%); Douglas/Johnson: 1,380,202 (29.5%); Breckinridge/Lane: 848,019 (18.2%); Bell/Everett: 590,901 (12.7%)		Opponent(s); Hannibal Hamlin (Republican); Herschel Johnson (Democratic); Joe Lane (Southern Democrats)

== See also ==
- List of Whig National Conventions
- History of the United States Whig Party
- Opposition Party (United States)
- List of United States Democratic Party presidential tickets
- List of United States Republican Party presidential tickets
- List of United States Green Party presidential tickets
- List of United States Libertarian Party presidential tickets
