= List of vice presidents of the United States by previous experience =

This sortable list summarizes the experience of each vice president of the United States before taking office. It lists up to four major elected or appointed offices or periods of military service in reverse chronological order, ending at the start of each person's first vice-presidential term. The table also gives each person's principal occupation before entering politics and home state at the time of election or appointment. A majority of the first 47 vice presidents had a background in the legal profession.

== By the numbers ==
Fifty people have served as vice president of the United States, from John Adams to JD Vance. The counts of prior experience use the start of each person's first vice-presidential term.

- A 2017 study by legal scholar Nick Robinson identified 32 of the first 47 vice presidents as lawyers.
- 26 served in the U.S. House of Representatives. Daniel D. Tompkins was elected to the House but resigned before taking his seat.
- 23 served in the U.S. Senate. John C. Calhoun and John C. Breckinridge began their Senate service after leaving the vice presidency.
- 15 served as state governors, including Mike Pence, governor of Indiana from 2013 to 2017. (Note: The Eagleton Center on the American Governor includes Levi P. Morton in its count of 16. Morton became governor of New York in 1895, two years after leaving the vice presidency.)
- 5 served as Cabinet secretaries. Thomas Jefferson and Martin Van Buren were secretaries of state, John C. Calhoun was secretary of war, Henry A. Wallace was secretary of agriculture, and Dick Cheney was secretary of defense.
- 3 vice presidents, Charles Curtis, Alben W. Barkley, and Lyndon B. Johnson, previously served as Senate majority leader.
- 2 vice presidents, Schuyler Colfax and John Nance Garner, previously served as speaker of the House.
- JD Vance was the first United States Marine Corps veteran to become vice president.

== List ==
Offices and periods of military service are ordered by when they ended. The dates cover service before each person took office as vice president.

Previous experience of U.S. vice presidents
No.	Portrait	Vice president	Most recent	Second most recent	Third most recent	Fourth most recent	Occupation	Home state
1	Portrait of John Adams	John Adams	U.S. minister to the Netherlands; 1782–1788	U.S. minister to Great Britain; 1785–1788	U.S. peace commissioner in Europe; 1781–1783	Massachusetts constitutional convention delegate 1779	Lawyer	Massachusetts
2	Portrait of Thomas Jefferson	Thomas Jefferson	U.S. secretary of state 1790–1793	U.S. minister to France; 1785–1789	Confederation Congress delegate 1783–1784	Governor of Virginia; 1779–1781	Lawyer, planter	Virginia
3	Portrait of Aaron Burr	Aaron Burr	New York State Assembly member 1800–1801	New York State Assembly member 1798–1799	U.S. senator 1791–1797	Attorney General of New York; 1789–1791	Lawyer	New York
4	Portrait of George Clinton	George Clinton	Governor of New York; 1801–1804	New York State Assembly member 1800–1801	Governor of New York; 1777–1795	President of the New York ratifying convention 1788	Lawyer	New York
5	Portrait of Elbridge Gerry	Elbridge Gerry	Governor of Massachusetts; 1810–1812	U.S. envoy to France; 1797–1798	U.S. representative 1789–1793	U.S. Constitutional Convention delegate 1787	Merchant	Massachusetts
6	Portrait of Daniel D. Tompkins	Daniel D. Tompkins (Note: Tompkins won election to the U.S. House in 1804 and resigned before taking his seat to join the New York Supreme Court.)	Governor of New York; 1807–1817	New York Supreme Court justice 1804–1807	New York State Assembly member 1803–1804	New York constitutional convention delegate 1801	Lawyer	New York
7	Portrait of John C. Calhoun	John C. Calhoun	U.S. secretary of war 1817–1825	U.S. representative 1811–1817	South Carolina House member 1808–1810	—	Lawyer	South Carolina
8	Portrait of Martin Van Buren	Martin Van Buren	U.S. minister to Great Britain; 1831–1832 (Note: Van Buren served as minister to Great Britain under a recess appointment. The Senate rejected his nomination in 1832.)	U.S. secretary of state 1829–1831	Governor of New York; 1829	U.S. senator 1821–1828	Lawyer	New York
9	Portrait of Richard Mentor Johnson	Richard Mentor Johnson (Note: The Senate elected Johnson vice president under the Twelfth Amendment after no candidate received a majority of the electoral votes.)	U.S. representative 1829–1837	U.S. senator 1819–1829	Kentucky House member 1819	U.S. representative 1807–1819 (Note: While serving in the House, Johnson commanded a regiment of Kentucky volunteers in the War of 1812.)	Lawyer	Kentucky
10	Portrait of John Tyler	John Tyler	Virginia House of Delegates member 1839	U.S. senator 1827–1836; President pro tempore, 1835	Governor of Virginia; 1825–1827	Virginia House of Delegates member 1823–1825	Lawyer	Virginia
11	Portrait of George M. Dallas	George M. Dallas	U.S. minister to Russia; 1837–1839	Attorney General of Pennsylvania; 1833–1835	U.S. senator 1831–1833	U.S. district attorney for eastern Pennsylvania; 1829–1831	Lawyer	Pennsylvania
12	Portrait of Millard Fillmore	Millard Fillmore	New York state comptroller 1848–1849	U.S. representative 1837–1843	U.S. representative 1833–1835	New York State Assembly member 1829–1831	Lawyer	New York
13	Portrait of William R. King	William R. King	U.S. senator 1848–1852; President pro tempore, 1850–1852	U.S. minister to France; 1844–1846	U.S. senator 1819–1844	Alabama constitutional convention delegate 1819	Lawyer	Alabama
14	Portrait of John C. Breckinridge	John C. Breckinridge	U.S. representative 1851–1855	Kentucky House member 1849	Major, 3rd Kentucky Volunteers; 1847–1848	—	Lawyer	Kentucky
15	Portrait of Hannibal Hamlin	Hannibal Hamlin	U.S. senator 1857–1861	Governor of Maine; 1857	U.S. senator 1848–1857	Maine House member 1847	Lawyer	Maine
16	Portrait of Andrew Johnson	Andrew Johnson	Military governor of Tennessee; 1862–1865	U.S. senator 1857–1862	Governor of Tennessee; 1853–1857	U.S. representative 1843–1853	Tailor	Tennessee
17	Portrait of Schuyler Colfax	Schuyler Colfax	U.S. representative 1855–1869; Speaker of the House, 1863–1869	Indiana constitutional convention delegate 1850–1851	Deputy auditor of St. Joseph County, Indiana appointed 1841	—	Newspaper editor and publisher	Indiana
18	Portrait of Henry Wilson	Henry Wilson	U.S. senator 1855–1873	Union Army colonel 1861	Massachusetts constitutional convention delegate 1853	Massachusetts state senator 1851–1853; Senate president, 1851–1853	Shoemaker	Massachusetts
19	Portrait of William A. Wheeler	William A. Wheeler	U.S. representative 1869–1877	President of the New York constitutional convention 1867–1868	U.S. representative 1861–1863	New York state senator 1858–1859	Lawyer	New York
20	Portrait of Chester A. Arthur	Chester A. Arthur	Collector of the Port of New York; 1871–1878	New York Militia quartermaster general 1862–1863	New York militia inspector general 1862	New York militia engineer-in-chief 1861	Lawyer, teacher	New York
21	Portrait of Thomas A. Hendricks	Thomas A. Hendricks	Governor of Indiana; 1873–1877	U.S. senator 1863–1869	Commissioner of the General Land Office; 1855–1859	U.S. representative 1851–1855	Lawyer	Indiana
22	Portrait of Levi P. Morton	Levi P. Morton (Note: Morton became governor of New York after his vice presidency.)	U.S. minister to France; 1881–1885	U.S. representative 1879–1881	U.S. honorary commissioner to the Paris Exposition; 1878	—	Merchant, banker	New York
23	Portrait of Adlai Stevenson I	Adlai Stevenson I	First assistant U.S. postmaster general 1885–1889	U.S. representative 1879–1881	U.S. representative 1875–1877	Illinois district attorney 1865–1868	Lawyer	Illinois
24	Portrait of Garret Hobart	Garret Hobart	New Jersey state senator 1877–1882; Senate president, 1881–1882	New Jersey General Assembly member 1873–1874; Assembly speaker, 1874	Counsel to the Passaic County Board of Freeholders elected 1872	City counsel of Paterson, New Jersey; 1871–1872	Lawyer	New Jersey
25	Portrait of Theodore Roosevelt	Theodore Roosevelt	Governor of New York; 1899–1900	Rough Riders officer 1898	U.S. assistant secretary of the Navy; 1897–1898	New York City police commissioner 1895–1897	Writer	New York
26	Portrait of Charles W. Fairbanks	Charles W. Fairbanks	U.S. senator 1897–1905	U.S. delegation chair, Joint High Commission; 1898	—	—	Railroad lawyer	Indiana
27	Portrait of James S. Sherman	James S. Sherman	U.S. representative 1893–1909	U.S. representative 1887–1891	Mayor of Utica, New York; 1884–1885	—	Lawyer	New York
28	Portrait of Thomas R. Marshall	Thomas R. Marshall	Governor of Indiana; 1909–1913	—	—	—	Lawyer	Indiana
29	Portrait of Calvin Coolidge	Calvin Coolidge	Governor of Massachusetts; 1919–1921	Lieutenant governor of Massachusetts; 1916–1919	Massachusetts state senator 1912–1915; Senate president, 1914–1915	Mayor of Northampton, Massachusetts; 1910–1911	Lawyer	Massachusetts
30	Portrait of Charles G. Dawes	Charles G. Dawes	Chair of the Allied reparations experts committee 1924 (Note: The Allied Reparation Commission appointed Dawes to chair a committee of experts. The committee produced the Dawes Plan.)	Director of the Bureau of the Budget; 1921–1922	U.S. Army officer 1917–1919	U.S. comptroller of the currency 1898–1901	Lawyer, banker	Illinois
31	Portrait of Charles Curtis	Charles Curtis	U.S. senator 1915–1929; Senate majority leader, 1925–1929	U.S. senator 1907–1913; President pro tempore, 1911	U.S. representative 1893–1907	County attorney of Shawnee County, Kansas; 1885–1889	Lawyer	Kansas
32	Portrait of John Nance Garner	John Nance Garner	U.S. representative 1903–1933; Speaker of the House, 1931–1933	Texas House member 1899–1903	County judge of Uvalde County, Texas; 1893–1896	—	Lawyer	Texas
33	Portrait of Henry A. Wallace	Henry A. Wallace	U.S. secretary of agriculture 1933–1940	—	—	—	Farmer, agricultural editor	Iowa
34	Portrait of Harry S. Truman	Harry S. Truman	U.S. senator 1935–1945	Presiding judge of Jackson County, Missouri; 1927–1935 (Note: The county judgeships in Jackson County were administrative posts.)	Eastern district judge of Jackson County, Missouri; 1923–1925	U.S. Army officer 1917–1919	Farmer, haberdasher	Missouri
35	Portrait of Alben W. Barkley	Alben W. Barkley	U.S. senator 1927–1949; Senate majority leader, 1937–1947, and minority leader, 1947–1949	U.S. representative 1913–1927	County judge of McCracken County, Kentucky; 1909–1913	Prosecuting attorney of McCracken County, Kentucky; 1905–1909	Lawyer	Kentucky
36	Portrait of Richard Nixon	Richard Nixon	U.S. senator 1950–1953	U.S. representative 1947–1950	U.S. Navy officer 1942–1946	Attorney, Office of Price Administration; 1942	Lawyer	California
37	Portrait of Lyndon B. Johnson	Lyndon B. Johnson	U.S. senator 1949–1961; Senate majority leader, 1955–1961	U.S. representative 1937–1949	U.S. Navy officer on active duty 1941–1942	Texas director of the National Youth Administration; 1935–1937	Teacher	Texas
38	Portrait of Hubert Humphrey	Hubert Humphrey	U.S. senator 1949–1964; Senate majority whip, 1961–1964	Mayor of Minneapolis; 1945–1948	Assistant director, War Manpower Commission; 1943	Chief of the Minnesota war service program 1942	Pharmacist, political science instructor	Minnesota
39	Portrait of Spiro Agnew	Spiro Agnew	Governor of Maryland; 1967–1969	Baltimore County executive 1962–1966	Member of the Baltimore County Zoning Board of Appeals; 1957–1961	U.S. Army officer World War II and Korean War	Lawyer	Maryland
40	Portrait of Gerald Ford	Gerald Ford (Note: Ford and Rockefeller took office after nomination by the president and confirmation by both houses of Congress under the Twenty-fifth Amendment.)	U.S. representative 1949–1973; House minority leader, 1965–1973	Warren Commission member 1963–1964	U.S. Naval Reserve officer 1942–1963; Active duty, 1942–1946	—	Lawyer	Michigan
41	Portrait of Nelson Rockefeller	Nelson Rockefeller	Member of the President's Foreign Intelligence Advisory Board; 1969–1974 (Note: Rockefeller remained on the board into his vice presidency.)	Governor of New York; 1959–1973	Chair of the President's Advisory Committee on Government Organization; 1953–1957	Special assistant to the president for foreign affairs 1954–1955	Business executive	New York
42	Portrait of Walter Mondale	Walter Mondale	U.S. senator 1964–1976	Attorney General of Minnesota; 1960–1964	Special assistant Minnesota attorney general 1958–1960	U.S. Army corporal 1951–1953	Lawyer	Minnesota
43	Portrait of George H. W. Bush	George H. W. Bush	Director of central intelligence 1976–1977	Chief of the U.S. Liaison Office in Beijing; 1974–1975	U.S. ambassador to the United Nations; 1971–1973	U.S. representative 1967–1971	Oil executive	Texas
44	Portrait of Dan Quayle	Dan Quayle	U.S. senator 1981–1989	U.S. representative 1977–1981	Indiana National Guard member 1969–1975	Director of inheritance taxes, Indiana Department of Revenue; 1973–1974	Lawyer, associate newspaper publisher	Indiana
45	Portrait of Al Gore	Al Gore	U.S. senator 1985–1993	U.S. representative 1977–1985	U.S. Army journalist 1969–1971	—	Journalist	Tennessee
46	Portrait of Dick Cheney	Dick Cheney (Note: After leaving the Defense Department, Cheney was chief executive of Halliburton from 1995 to 2000.)	U.S. secretary of defense 1989–1993	U.S. representative 1979–1989; House Republican whip, 1989	White House chief of staff 1975–1977	Deputy assistant to the president 1974–1975	Power company equipment operator	Wyoming
47	Portrait of Joe Biden	Joe Biden	U.S. senator 1973–2009	New Castle County council member 1970–1972	—	—	Lawyer	Delaware
48	Portrait of Mike Pence	Mike Pence	Governor of Indiana; 2013–2017	U.S. representative 2001–2013; House Republican Conference chair, 2009–2011	—	—	Lawyer, radio host	Indiana
49	Portrait of Kamala Harris	Kamala Harris	U.S. senator 2017–2021	Attorney General of California; 2011–2017	District attorney of San Francisco; 2004–2011	Attorney, San Francisco City Attorney’s Office; 2000–2004	Lawyer, prosecutor	California
50	Portrait of JD Vance	JD Vance	U.S. senator 2023–2025	U.S. Marine Corps corporal 2003–2007	—	—	Venture capitalist, writer, lawyer	Ohio

== See also ==
- List of presidents of the United States by previous experience
