= List of former presidents of the United States who ran for office =

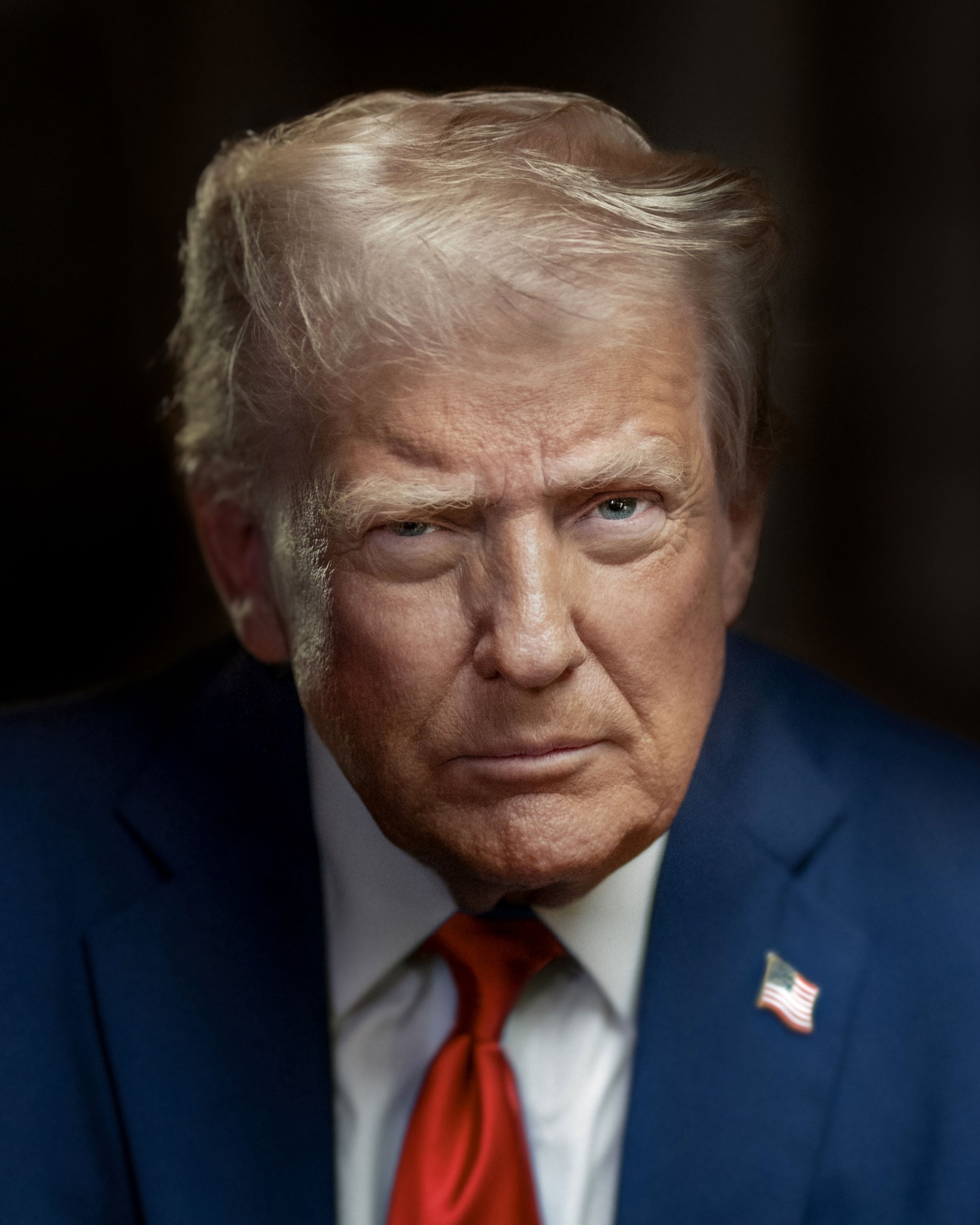
Grover Cleveland and Donald Trump are the only two presidents to serve non-consecutive terms.

This is a list of former presidents of the United States who ran for office (the presidency, a seat in Congress, or governor) after leaving office as president. It does not include presidents who sought reelection to a consecutive term while still in office. Prior to the passage of the Twenty-second Amendment, presidents could run for reelection without restriction; since then, presidents can be reelected only once. Grover Cleveland was the first president to win reelection after leaving office.

Some presidents have been recruited, requested, or drafted to run again. This list, however, only includes those presidents who actively campaigned.

== Presidency ==
This list only includes former presidents who ran again for president.

President	Previous term	Reason the president first left office	Year of attempted comeback	Result	Notes
Martin Van Buren	1837–1841	Defeated in the general election	1844	Failed nomination	Failed in his attempt to win the nomination of the Democratic Party
Martin Van Buren	1837–1841	Defeated in the general election	1848	Lost	First nominee of the newly formed Free Soil Party
Millard Fillmore	1850–1853	Denied nomination by his party	1856	Lost	Nominee for the American Party (Know Nothing)
Ulysses S. Grant	1869–1877	Retired	1880	Failed nomination	Failed in his attempt to win the nomination of the Republican Party
Grover Cleveland	1885–1889	Defeated in the general election	1892	Won	First president to win a second nonconsecutive term (1893–1897)
Theodore Roosevelt	1901–1909	Retired	1912	Lost	Nominee of the Progressive Party (Bull Moose), after he was denied the nomination of the Republican Party.
Herbert Hoover	1929–1933	Defeated in the general election	1940	Failed nomination	Failed in his attempt to win the nomination of the Republican Party
Donald Trump	2017–2021	Defeated in the general election	2024	Won	Second president to win a second nonconsecutive term (2025–present)

== Other selected office ==
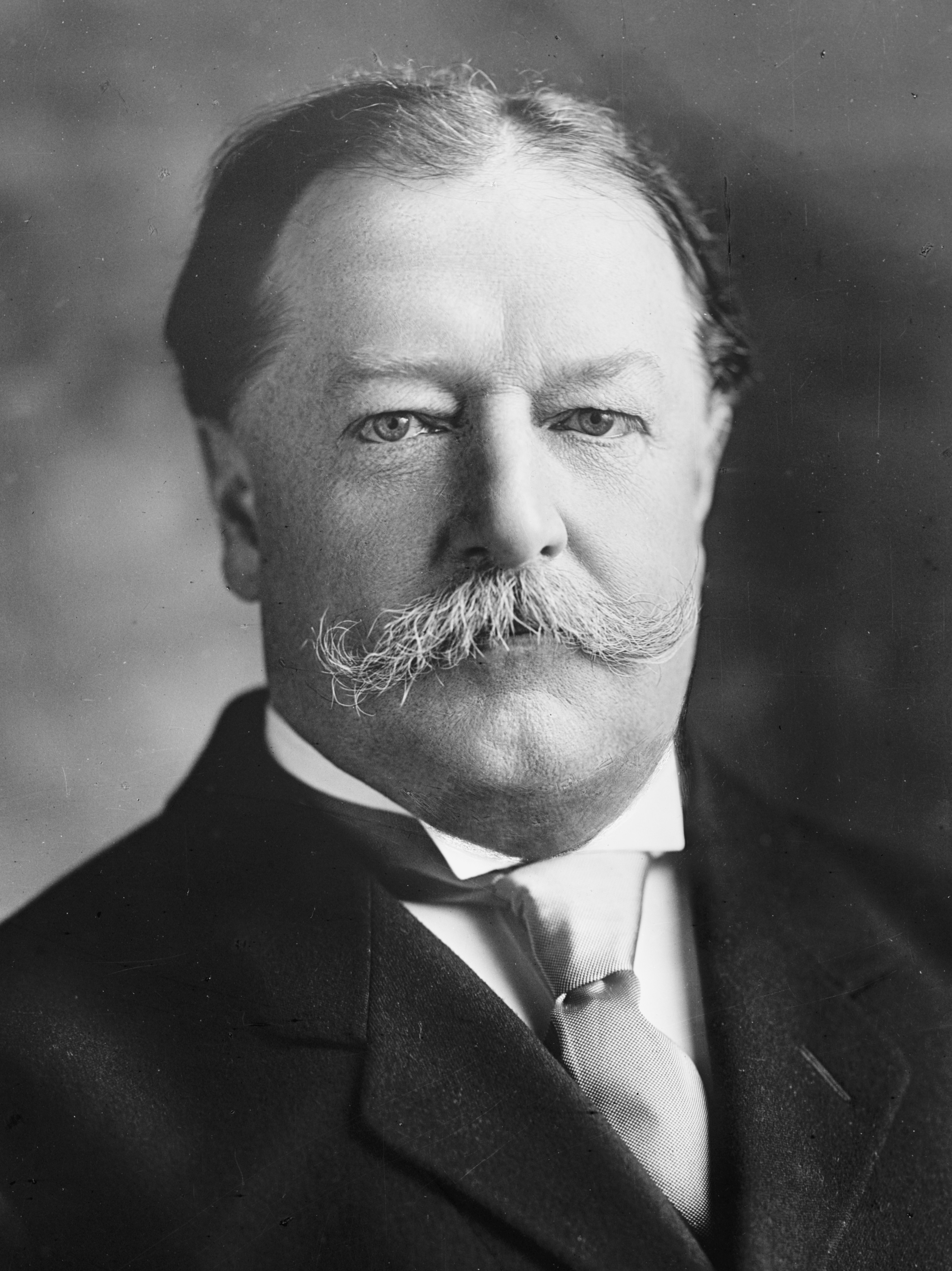
William Howard Taft is the only former president to serve as chief justice of the United States.

President	Presidential term	Reason for leaving office	Year of election	Office	Result	Notes
James Madison	1809–1817	Chose not to run again	1829	Virginia Constitutional Convention of 1829–1830	Won	Represented Orange County, Virginia
James Monroe	1817–1825	Chose not to run again	1829	Virginia Constitutional Convention of 1829–1830	Won	Represented Loudoun County, Virginia
James Monroe	1817–1825	Chose not to run again	1829	Presiding officer of the Virginia Constitutional Convention of 1829–1830	Won	Withdrew on December 8 due to failing health
John Quincy Adams	1825–1829	Defeated in the general election	1830–1846 (9 elections)	U.S. House of Representatives	Won	Only former president to serve in the House, served until his 1848 death
John Quincy Adams	1825–1829	Defeated in the general election	1833	Governor of Massachusetts	Lost	Continued in House after defeat
John Tyler	1841–1845	Denied nomination by his party/withdrew from race	1861	Confederate States Congress	Won	Died before he could take office (had served in the unelected Provisional Congress). Only former president to ever run for an office outside the United States
Andrew Johnson	1865–1869	Denied nomination by his party	1872	U.S. House of Representatives	Lost	Ran as an Independent and finished 3rd in the general election
Andrew Johnson	1865–1869	Denied nomination by his party	1874	U.S. Senate	Won	Only former president to serve in the Senate, served until his 1875 death
William Howard Taft	1909–1913	Defeated in the general election	1921	Chief Justice of the United States	Confirmed	Only former president ever to serve on the Supreme Court, served until his 1930 resignation

== See also ==
- List of presidents of the United States by other offices held
