= List of Green Party of the United States presidential tickets =

This is a list of the candidates for the offices of President of the United States and Vice President of the United States of the Green Party of the United States. Opponents who received over one percent of the popular vote or ran an official campaign that received Electoral College votes are listed. Offices held prior to Election Day are included, and those held on Election Day have an italicized end date.

In 2024, the Green Party's presidential ticket, appeared on the ballot in 39 states, with write-in status in 7 others including the District of Columbia.

== List of Green Party presidential tickets ==
=== 1996, 2000 ===
Presidential nominee	1996 (lost), 2000 (lost)		Vice presidential nominee
Ralph Nader of CT (born 1934)	Prior experience: Consumer protection lawyer; Higher education: Princeton University (BA); Harvard University (LLB)	Prior experience: Economist; Higher education: Harvard University (BA); Antioch University (MA)	Winona LaDuke of CA (born 1959)
Opponent(s); Bill Clinton (Democratic); Bob Dole (Republican); Ross Perot (Reform)	Electoral vote: Clinton/Gore: 379 (70.4%); Dole/Kemp: 159 (29.6%); Popular vote: Clinton/Gore: 47,401,185 (49.2%); Dole/Kemp: 39,197,469 (40.7%); Perot/Choate: 8,085,294 (8.4%); Nader/LaDuke: 685,297 (0.7%)		Opponent(s); Al Gore (Democratic); Jack Kemp (Republican); Pat Choate (Reform)
Opponent(s); George W. Bush (Republican); Al Gore (Democratic)	Electoral vote: Bush/Cheney: 271 (50.4%); Gore/Lieberman: 266 (49.4%); Popular vote: Gore/Lieberman: 50,999,897 (48.4%); Bush/Cheney: 50,456,002 (47.9%); Nader/LaDuke: 2,882,955 (2.7%)		Opponent(s); Dick Cheney (Republican); Joe Lieberman (Democratic)

=== 2004 ===
Presidential nominee	2004 (lost)		Vice presidential nominee
David Cobb of TX (born 1962)	Prior experience: Attorney; Higher education: University of Houston (BA, JD)	Prior experience: Activist; Higher education: Boston College (BA); University of Amsterdam (MA)	Pat LaMarche of ME (born 1960)
Opponent(s); George W. Bush (Republican); John Kerry (Democratic)	Electoral vote (President): Bush: 286 (53.2%); Kerry: 251 (46.7%) (Note: A faithless elector voted Edwards for president and vice president in the Electoral College, otherwise Kerry would have won 252 (46.8%) votes.); Edwards: 1 (0.2%); Electoral vote (Vice President): Cheney: 286 (53.2%); Edwards: 252 (46.8%); Popular vote: Bush/Cheney: 62,040,610 (50.7%); Kerry/Edwards: 59,028,444 (48.3%); Cobb/LaMarche: 119,859 (0.1%)		Opponent(s); Dick Cheney (Republican); John Edwards (Democratic)

=== 2008 ===
Presidential nominee	2008 (lost)		Vice presidential nominee
Cynthia McKinney of GA (born 1955)	Prior experience: Georgia House of Representatives (1988–1993); U.S. House of Representatives (1993–1997, 2005–2007); Higher education: University of Southern California (BA); Tufts University (MA)	Prior experience: Journalist; Higher education: State University of New York, Albany (BA); Cornell University (MPS)	Rosa Clemente of NC (born 1972)
Opponent(s); Barack Obama (Democratic); John McCain (Republican)	Electoral vote: Obama/Biden: 365 (67.8%); McCain/Palin: 173 (32.2%); Popular vote: Obama/Biden: 69,498,516 (52.9%); McCain/Palin: 59,948,323 (45.7%); McKinney/Clemente: 161,797 (0.1%)		Opponent(s); Joe Biden (Democratic); Sarah Palin (Republican)

=== 2012, 2016 ===
Presidential nominee	2012 (lost), 2016 (lost)		Vice presidential nominee
Jill Stein of MA (born 1950)	Prior experience: Physician; Activist; Higher education: Harvard University (BA, MD)	Prior experience: Activist; Higher education: None	Cheri Honkala of PA (born 1963) (2012)
Jill Stein of MA (born 1950)	Prior experience: Physician; Activist; Higher education: Harvard University (BA, MD)	Prior experience: Professor; Activist; Higher education: City College of New York (attended); University of South Florida (BA); Clark Atlanta University (MA, PhD)	Ajamu Baraka of IL (born 1953) (2016)
Opponent(s); Barack Obama (Democratic); Mitt Romney (Republican)	Electoral vote: Obama/Biden: 332 (61.7%); Romney/Ryan: 206 (38.3%); Popular vote: Obama/Biden: 65,915,796 (51.1%); Romney/Ryan: 60,933,500 (47.2%); Johnson/Gray: 1,275,971 (1.0%); Stein/Honkala: 469,627 (0.4%)		Opponent(s); Joe Biden (Democratic); Paul Ryan (Republican)
Opponent(s); Donald Trump (Republican); Hillary Clinton (Democratic); Gary Johnson (Libertarian)	Electoral vote (President) (Note: If not for faithless electors, Trump and Pence would have won 306 Electoral College votes each, while Clinton and Kaine would have won 232 votes.): Trump: 304 (56.5%); Clinton: 227 (42.2%); Powell: 3 (0.6%); Kasich: 1 (0.2%); Paul: 1 (0.2%); Sanders: 1 (0.2%); Spotted Eagle: 1 (0.2%); Electoral vote (Vice President): Pence: 305 (56.7%); Kaine: 227 (42.2%); Warren: 2 (0.4%); Cantwell: 1 (0.2%); Collins: 1 (0.2%); Fiorina: 1 (0.2%); LaDuke: 1 (0.2%); Popular vote: Clinton/Kaine: 65,853,516 (48.2%); Trump/Pence: 62,984,825 (46.1%); Johnson/Weld: 4,489,341 (3.3%); Stein/Baraka: 1,457,216 (1.1%)		Opponent(s); Mike Pence (Republican); Tim Kaine (Democratic); Bill Weld (Libertarian)

=== 2020 ===
Presidential nominee	2020 (lost)		Vice presidential nominee
Howie Hawkins of NY (born 1952)	Prior experience: Trade unionist; Activist; Higher education: Dartmouth College (attended)	Prior experience: Labor organizer; Higher education: University of North Florida (attended)	Angela Nicole Walker of WI (born 1974)
Opponent(s); Joe Biden (Democratic); Donald Trump (Republican); Jo Jorgensen (Libertarian)	Electoral vote: Biden/Harris: 306 (56.9%); Trump/Pence: 232 (43.1%); Popular vote: Biden/Harris: 81,283,495 (51.4%); Trump/Pence: 74,223,755 (46.9%); Jorgensen/Cohen: 1,865,873 (1.2%); Hawkins/Walker: 399,116 (0.3%)		Opponent(s); Kamala Harris (Democratic); Mike Pence (Republican); Spike Cohen (Libertarian)

=== 2024 ===
Presidential nominee	2024 (lost)		Vice presidential nominee
Jill Stein of MA (born 1950)	Prior experience: Physician; Activist; Higher education: Harvard University (BA, MD)	Prior experience: Educator; Activist; Higher education: University of Minnesota (BA); University of Pennsylvania (MA, PhD)	Butch Ware of CA (born 1974)
Opponent(s); Donald Trump (Republican); Kamala Harris (Democratic)	Electoral vote: Trump/Vance: 295 (54.8%); Harris/Walz: 226 (44.2%); Popular vote: Trump/Vance: 77,303,573 (49.9%); Harris/Walz: 75,019,257 (48.4%); Stein/Ware: 868,945 (0.6%)		Opponent(s) JD Vance (Republican); Tim Walz (Democratic)

== See also ==
- List of United States Democratic Party presidential tickets
- List of United States Republican Party presidential tickets
- List of United States Libertarian Party presidential tickets
