= List of presidents of the United States by other offices held =

This is a list of presidents of the United States by other offices (either elected or appointed) held. Every president except Donald Trump has served as at least one of the following:

- a member of the presidential cabinet (either vice president or cabinet secretary)
- a member of Congress (either U.S. senator or representative)
- a governor of a state
- a general of the United States Army

== Federal government ==
=== Executive branch ===
==== Vice presidents ====
Fifteen vice presidents have gone on to become president.

Vice President	President served under	Year(s) served	Notes
John Adams	George Washington	1789–1797	Incumbent vice president succeeded Washington after winning the 1796 election
Thomas Jefferson	John Adams	1797–1801	Incumbent vice president succeeded Adams after winning the 1800 election
Martin Van Buren	Andrew Jackson	1833–1837	Incumbent vice president succeeded Jackson after winning the 1836 election
John Tyler	William Henry Harrison	1841	Became president after Harrison's death, ran for election in 1844 as nominee of Democratic Party before dropping out and endorsing Polk, the eventual winner
Millard Fillmore	Zachary Taylor	1849–1850	Became president after Taylor's death, lost nomination for Whig Party in 1852 election bid, later also ran unsuccessfully in the 1856 election
Andrew Johnson	Abraham Lincoln	1865	Became president after Lincoln's assassination, lost nomination for the Democratic Party in 1868 election bid
Chester A. Arthur	James A. Garfield	1881	Became president after Garfield's assassination, failed to secure the Republican Party nomination in 1884 election bid
Theodore Roosevelt	William McKinley	1901	Became president after McKinley's assassination, later elected to own term in 1904
Calvin Coolidge	Warren G. Harding	1921–1923	Became president after Harding's death, later elected to own term in 1924
Harry S. Truman	Franklin D. Roosevelt	1945	Became president after Roosevelt's death, later elected to own term in 1948
Richard Nixon	Dwight D. Eisenhower	1953–1961	Lost as incumbent vice president in the 1960 election, later ran and won the 1968 election becoming the first former vice president to win the presidency
Lyndon B. Johnson	John F. Kennedy	1961–1963	Became president after Kennedy's assassination, later elected to own term in 1964
Gerald Ford	Richard Nixon	1973–1974	Became president after Nixon's resignation, lost the 1976 election in bid for own term
George H. W. Bush	Ronald Reagan	1981–1989	Incumbent vice president succeeded Reagan after winning the 1988 election
Joe Biden	Barack Obama	2009–2017	Did not run as incumbent vice president in the 2016 election, later ran and won the 2020 election becoming the second former vice president to win the presidency

Fifteen former vice presidents (Richard Mentor Johnson, John C. Breckinridge, Levi P. Morton, Adlai Stevenson I, Charles W. Fairbanks, John Nance Garner, Henry A. Wallace, Alben W. Barkley, Richard Nixon, Hubert Humphrey, Walter Mondale, Dan Quayle, Al Gore, Mike Pence, and Kamala Harris) all made failed runs for the presidency. Breckinridge was nominated by the Southern Democratic Party in 1860 but came in second in the Electoral College. Humphrey, Mondale, Gore, Harris, and Nixon received their party's nominations. Nixon, who lost the 1960 election as the sitting vice president, was elected president in 1968, becoming the first former vice president to win the presidency after leaving the office; Biden became the second in 2020. Only four sitting vice presidents (John Adams, Thomas Jefferson, Martin Van Buren, and George H. W. Bush) have been elected directly to the presidency. Theodore Roosevelt, Calvin Coolidge, Harry S. Truman, and Lyndon B. Johnson became president upon a president's death in office and went on to win their own subsequent elections.

==== Cabinet secretaries ====
Six future presidents served as secretary of state.

Secretary	Office	President served under	Year(s) served
Thomas Jefferson	Secretary of State	George Washington	1790–1793
James Madison	Secretary of State	Thomas Jefferson	1801–1809
James Monroe	Secretary of State	James Madison	1811–1817
James Monroe	Secretary of War	James Madison	1814–1815
John Quincy Adams	Secretary of State	James Monroe	1817–1825
Martin Van Buren	Secretary of State	Andrew Jackson	1829–1831
James Buchanan	Secretary of State	James K. Polk	1845–1849
Ulysses S. Grant	Acting Secretary of War	Andrew Johnson	1867–1868
William Howard Taft	Secretary of War	Theodore Roosevelt	1904–1908
Herbert Hoover	Secretary of Commerce	Warren G. Harding	1921–1928
Herbert Hoover	Secretary of Commerce	Calvin Coolidge	1921–1928

Calvin Coolidge (as the vice president) and Herbert Hoover both served in the Cabinet of Warren G. Harding.

==== Ambassadors ====
President	Position	President served under	Year(s) served
John Adams	Minister to Britain	Congress of the Confederation	1785–1788
Thomas Jefferson	Minister Plenipotentiary to France	Congress of the Confederation	1785–1789
James Monroe	Minister Plenipotentiary to France	George Washington	1794–1796
James Monroe	Minister to Britain	Thomas Jefferson	1803–1807
John Quincy Adams	Minister to the Netherlands	George Washington; John Adams	1794–1797
John Quincy Adams	Minister to Prussia	John Adams	1797–1801
John Quincy Adams	Minister to Russia	James Madison	1809–1814
John Quincy Adams	Minister to Britain	James Madison	1815–1817
Martin Van Buren	Minister to Britain	Andrew Jackson	1831–1832
William Henry Harrison	Minister to Gran Colombia	John Quincy Adams	1828–1829
James Buchanan	Minister to Russia	Andrew Jackson	1832–1833
James Buchanan	Minister to Britain	Franklin Pierce	1853–1856
George H. W. Bush	Ambassador to the United Nations	Richard Nixon	1971–1973
George H. W. Bush	Chief of the U.S. Liaison Office in Beijing	Gerald Ford	1974–1975

==== Other federal appointees ====
President	Office	President appointed by	Year(s) served
Franklin Pierce	United States Attorney for the District of New Hampshire	James K. Polk	1845–1847
Chester A. Arthur	Collector of the Port of New York	Ulysses S. Grant	1871–1878
Theodore Roosevelt	Member, United States Civil Service Commission	Benjamin Harrison	1889–1895
Theodore Roosevelt	Assistant Secretary of the Navy	William McKinley	1897–1898
William Howard Taft	Solicitor General	Benjamin Harrison	1890–1892
Franklin D. Roosevelt	Assistant Secretary of the Navy	Woodrow Wilson	1913–1920
George H. W. Bush	Director of Central Intelligence	Gerald Ford	1976–1977

=== Judicial branch ===
==== Chief Justice of the United States ====
President	President nominated by	Year(s) served	Notes
William Howard Taft	Warren G. Harding	1921–1930	Only president to serve on the Supreme Court

==== Other federal judges ====
President	Court	President nominated by	Year(s) served
William Howard Taft	United States Court of Appeals for the Sixth Circuit	Benjamin Harrison	1892–1900

=== Legislative branch ===
==== United States (US) Senators ====
Seventeen presidents served in the U.S. Senate, three of whom moved directly from the Senate to the White House.

State	President	Year(s) served	Notes
California	Richard Nixon	1950–1953	Resigned to become vice president
Delaware	Joe Biden	1973–2009	Resigned to become vice president
Indiana	Benjamin Harrison	1881–1887	
Illinois	Barack Obama	2005–2008	Third sitting senator elected to the presidency
Massachusetts	John Quincy Adams	1803–1808	
Massachusetts	John F. Kennedy	1953–1960	Second sitting senator elected to the presidency
Missouri	Harry S. Truman	1935–1945	Resigned to become vice president
New Hampshire	Franklin Pierce	1837–1842	
New York	Martin Van Buren	1821–1828	
Ohio	William Henry Harrison	1825–1828	
Ohio	Warren G. Harding	1915–1921	First sitting senator elected to the presidency
Pennsylvania	James Buchanan	1834–1845	
Tennessee	Andrew Jackson	1797–1798	
Tennessee	Andrew Jackson	1823–1825	
Tennessee	Andrew Johnson	1857–1862	
Tennessee	Andrew Johnson	1875	Only former president in the Senate
Texas	Lyndon B. Johnson	1949–1961	Senate minority leader 1953–1955; Senate majority leader 1955–1961; Resigned to become vice president
Virginia	James Monroe	1790–1794	First former senator to become president
Virginia	John Tyler	1827–1836	Only former president pro tempore to become president

A number of future presidents served together while in the Senate:

- James Monroe served under Vice President John Adams (1790–1794).
- Andrew Jackson served under Vice President Thomas Jefferson (1797–1798). Jackson later served with Martin Van Buren (1823–1825). Van Buren also served with William Henry Harrison (1825–1828) and John Tyler (1827–1828). James Buchanan also served with Tyler (1834–1836) and later served with Franklin Pierce (1837–1842). Both Buchanan and Tyler served under Van Buren (1833–1837), while Buchanan and Pierce briefly served under Tyler (1841).
- Benjamin Harrison briefly served under Vice President Chester A. Arthur (1881).
- Lyndon B. Johnson served with both Richard Nixon (1950–1953) and John F. Kennedy (1953–1960). Johnson and Kennedy both served under Nixon (1953–1961).
- Joe Biden served under vice presidents Gerald Ford (1973–1974) and George H. W. Bush (1981–1989) and later served with Barack Obama (2005–2008).

James A. Garfield was elected senator for Ohio in 1880, but he did not take up the office due to being elected president later that year.

Seven former senators (Monroe, Adams, Jackson, W. H. Harrison, Pierce, Buchanan, and B. Harrison) were elected to the presidency without ever serving as the vice president between their departure from the Senate and the beginning of their presidencies.

==== Representatives ====
Nineteen presidents served in the House of Representatives.

State	President	Year(s) served	Notes
California	Richard Nixon	1947–1950	
Illinois	Abraham Lincoln	1847–1849	
Massachusetts	John Quincy Adams	1831–1848	Only former president in the House of Representatives
Massachusetts	John F. Kennedy	1947–1953	
Michigan	Gerald Ford	1949–1973	House minority leader 1965–1973; Resigned to become vice president
New Hampshire	Franklin Pierce	1833–1837	
New York	Millard Fillmore	1833–1835	
New York	Millard Fillmore	1837–1843	
Northwest Territory	William Henry Harrison	1799–1800	Served as a non-voting delegate
Ohio	William Henry Harrison	1816–1819	
Ohio	Rutherford B. Hayes	1865–1867	
Ohio	James A. Garfield	1863–1880	Republican floor leader 1877–1880; Only sitting representative elected to the presidency
Ohio	William McKinley	1877–1883	
Ohio	William McKinley	1885–1891	
Pennsylvania	James Buchanan	1821–1831	
Tennessee	Andrew Jackson	1796–1797	
Tennessee	James K. Polk	1825–1839	Only former speaker to become president
Tennessee	Andrew Johnson	1843–1853	
Texas	Lyndon B. Johnson	1937–1949	
Texas	George H. W. Bush	1967–1971	
Virginia	James Madison	1789–1797	First former representative to become president
Virginia	John Tyler	1816–1821	

A number of future and former presidents served in the House together:

- Andrew Jackson served with James Madison (1796–1797).
- William Henry Harrison served with John Tyler (1816–1819).
- James Buchanan served with James K. Polk (1825–1831). Polk also served with John Quincy Adams (1831–1839). Adams later served with Millard Fillmore (1833–1835; 1837–1843), Franklin Pierce (1833–1837), Andrew Johnson (1843–1848), and Abraham Lincoln (1847–1848). Johnson and Lincoln would continue to serve alongside each other (1848–1849).
- James A. Garfield served with both Rutherford B. Hayes (1865–1867) and William McKinley (1877–1880).
- Richard Nixon served with Lyndon B. Johnson (1947–1949), John F. Kennedy (1947–1950), and Gerald Ford (1949–1950). Ford, who continued to serve alongside Kennedy (1950–1953), later served with George H. W. Bush (1967–1971).

1835 was the year in which the most former and future presidents served together in Congress: six presidents (Representatives Adams, Pierce, Fillmore, and Polk, and Senators Buchanan and Tyler), who all served under vice president (and future president) Martin Van Buren.

The time period between 1891 and 1915 (24 years) was the longest time period with no former or future presidents serving in Congress. In total, there were 65 years in which no former or future president was serving in Congress.

As of 2026, ten presidents had served in both chambers of Congress (John Quincy Adams, Andrew Jackson, William Henry Harrison, John Tyler, Franklin Pierce, James Buchanan, Andrew Johnson, John F. Kennedy, Lyndon B. Johnson, and Richard Nixon), two presidents who served in both the Continental Congress and the Congress of the United States (James Madison and James Monroe), and one president who served in both the U.S. Congress and the Provisional Congress of the Confederate States (John Tyler).

=== Continental Congress ===
President	State	Year(s) served	Body served
George Washington	Virginia	1774–1775	First Continental Congress
John Adams	Massachusetts	1774–1777	First Continental Congress, Second Continental Congress
Thomas Jefferson	Virginia	1775–1776; 1783–1784	Second Continental Congress, Congress of the Confederation
James Madison	Virginia	1780–1783; 1787–1788	Second Continental Congress, Congress of the Confederation
James Monroe	Virginia	1783–1786	Congress of the Confederation

== State and territorial government ==
=== Governors ===
State / Territory	President	Year(s) served	Notes
American occupation zone in Germany	Dwight D. Eisenhower	1945	Military governor
Arkansas	Bill Clinton	1979–1981	
Arkansas	Bill Clinton	1983–1992	
California	Ronald Reagan	1967–1975	
Cuba	William Howard Taft	1906	Provisional governor
Florida Territory	Andrew Jackson	1821	Military governor
Georgia	Jimmy Carter	1971–1975	
Indiana Territory	William Henry Harrison	1801–1813	
Louisiana District	William Henry Harrison	1804–1805	Interim authority
Massachusetts	Calvin Coolidge	1919–1921	
New Jersey	Woodrow Wilson	1911–1913	
New York	Martin Van Buren	1829	
New York	Grover Cleveland	1883–1885	
New York	Theodore Roosevelt	1899–1900	
New York	Franklin D. Roosevelt	1929–1932	
Northwest Territory	William Henry Harrison	1798–1799	Acting governor
Ohio	Rutherford B. Hayes	1868–1872	
Ohio	Rutherford B. Hayes	1876–1877	
Ohio	William McKinley	1892–1896	
Philippines	William Howard Taft	1901–1904	Governor-general
Tennessee	James K. Polk	1839–1841	
Tennessee	Andrew Johnson	1853–1857	
Tennessee	Andrew Johnson	1862–1865	Military governor
Texas	George W. Bush	1995–2000	
Virginia	Thomas Jefferson	1779–1781	
Virginia	James Monroe	1799–1802	
Virginia	James Monroe	1811	
Virginia	John Tyler	1825–1827	

=== State legislators ===
State legislature	President	Year(s)served	Notes
Georgia State Senate	Jimmy Carter	1963–1967	
Illinois House of Representatives	Abraham Lincoln	1834–1842	
Illinois Senate	Barack Obama	1997–2004	
Massachusetts House of Representatives	Calvin Coolidge	1907–1909	
Massachusetts Senate	John Quincy Adams	1802	
Massachusetts Senate	Calvin Coolidge	1912–1915	
New Hampshire House of Representatives	Franklin Pierce	1829–1833	Speaker of the House, 1832–1833
New York State Senate	Martin Van Buren	1812–1820	
New York State Senate	Franklin D. Roosevelt	1911–1913	
New York State Assembly	Millard Fillmore	1829–1831	
New York State Assembly	Theodore Roosevelt	1882–1884	Assembly minority leader in 1883
Ohio Senate	William Henry Harrison	1819–1821	
Ohio Senate	James A. Garfield	1859–1861	
Ohio Senate	Warren G. Harding	1899–1903	
Pennsylvania House of Representatives	James Buchanan	1814–1816	
Tennessee House of Representatives	James K. Polk	1823–1825	
Tennessee House of Representatives	Andrew Johnson	1835–1837	
Tennessee Senate	Andrew Johnson	1841–1843	
Virginia House of Delegates	Thomas Jefferson	1776–1779	
Virginia House of Delegates	James Madison	1776–1777	
Virginia House of Delegates	James Monroe	1782–1783	
Virginia House of Delegates	John Tyler	1811–1816	
Virginia House of Delegates	John Tyler	1823–1825	

=== Other statewide offices ===
President	Office and jurisdiction	Year(s) served
Andrew Jackson	Justice of the Tennessee Supreme Court	1798–1804
Martin Van Buren	Attorney General of New York	1815–1819
Millard Fillmore	New York State Comptroller	1847–1849
Warren G. Harding	Lieutenant Governor of Ohio	1904–1906
Calvin Coolidge	Lieutenant Governor of Massachusetts	1916–1919
Bill Clinton	Attorney General of Arkansas	1977–1979

== Local government ==
President	Office and jurisdiction	Year(s) served
George Washington	County surveyor in Mount Vernon	1749–1751
Martin Van Buren	Surrogate of Columbia County, New York	1808–1812
Abraham Lincoln	Postmaster of New Salem, Illinois	1832–1833
Abraham Lincoln	County Surveyor for Sangamon County, Illinois	1833–1834
Andrew Johnson	Alderman, Greeneville, Tennessee	1828–1830
Andrew Johnson	Mayor of Greeneville, Tennessee	1834–1835
Grover Cleveland	Sheriff of Erie County, New York	1871–1873
Grover Cleveland	Mayor of Buffalo, New York	1882–1883
William Howard Taft	Judge on the Superior Court of Cincinnati	1887–1890
Theodore Roosevelt	Superintendent of the New York Board of Police Commissioners	1895–1897
Calvin Coolidge	Mayor of Northampton, Massachusetts	1910–1911
Harry S. Truman	Judge of Jackson County, Missouri's Eastern District	1923–1925
Harry S. Truman	Presiding Judge of Jackson County, Missouri	1927–1935
Joe Biden	Member of the New Castle County, Delaware County Council	1970–1972

== Presidents who had not previously held elective office ==
=== With previous experience in government ===
President	Term of office	Notes
Ulysses S. Grant	1867–1868	Acting Secretary of War
Herbert Hoover	1921–1928	Secretary of Commerce
Dwight D. Eisenhower	1945	Military governor of the American occupation zone in Germany

=== With previous experience in the military ===
President	Term of office	Position(s)
Major General Zachary Taylor	1849–1850	Major general in the United States Army
General of the Army of the United States Ulysses S. Grant	1869–1877	Commanding General of the United States Army (1864–1869)
General of the Army Dwight D. Eisenhower	1953–1961	Supreme Allied Commander Europe (1951–1952)

=== Without previous experience in government or the military ===
President	Term of office	Notes
Donald Trump	2017–2021	Chairman of The Trump Organization

== Colonial governments ==
=== Colonial and confederate legislators ===
Legislature	President	Year(s) served	Notes
Confederate Congress	John Tyler	1861–1862	Delegate to the Provisional Confederate Congress and elected to the House of Representatives of the Confederate Congress of the Confederate States of America during the Civil War, but died before entering office
Massachusetts House of Representatives	John Adams	1768–1774	All served as regular members of their colonial legislature under the Kingdom of Great Britain before 1776.
Virginia House of Burgesses	George Washington	1758–1774	All served as regular members of their colonial legislature under the Kingdom of Great Britain before 1776.
Virginia House of Burgesses	Thomas Jefferson	1769–1774	All served as regular members of their colonial legislature under the Kingdom of Great Britain before 1776.

== See also ==
- List of former presidents of the United States who ran for office
- List of vice presidents of the United States by other offices held
