= List of United States Republican Party presidential tickets =

This is a list of the candidates for the offices of president of the United States and vice president of the United States of the Republican Party, either duly preselected and nominated, or the presumptive nominees of a future preselection and election. Opponents who received over one percent of the popular vote or ran an official campaign that received Electoral College votes are listed. Offices held prior to Election Day are included, and those held on Election Day have an italicized end date.

== 19th century ==
=== 1856 ===
Presidential nominee	1856 (lost)		Vice presidential nominee
John C. Frémont of CA (1813–1890)	Prior public experience: Governor of California (1847); Shadow Senator (1849–1850); U.S. Senate (1850–1851); Higher education: College of Charleston (attended)	Prior public experience: Associate Justice of the New Jersey Supreme Court (1838–1841); U.S. Senate (1842–1851); Chair of the Senate Public Buildings Committee (1842–1845); Chair of the Senate Engrossed Bills Committee (1844–1845); Higher education: Princeton University (BA)	William L. Dayton of NJ (1807–1864)
Opponent(s); James Buchanan (Democratic); Millard Fillmore (Know Nothing)	Electoral vote: Buchanan/Breckinridge: 174 (58.8%); Frémont/Dayton: 114 (38.5%); Fillmore/Donelson: 8 (2.7%); Popular vote: Buchanan/Breckinridge: 1,836,072 (45.3%); Frémont/Dayton: 1,342,345 (33.1%); Fillmore/Donelson: 873,053 (21.5%)		Opponent(s); John C. Breckinridge (Democratic); Andrew Jackson Donelson (Know Nothing)

=== 1860, 1864 ===
Presidential nominee	1860 (won), 1864 (won)		Vice presidential nominee
Abraham Lincoln of IL (1809–1865)	Prior public experience: Illinois House of Representatives (1834–1842); U.S. House of Representatives (1847–1849); President (1861–1865); Higher education: None	Prior public experience: Maine House of Representatives (1836–1841, 1847); Speaker of the Maine House of Representatives (1837–1838, 1839–1840); U.S. House of Representatives (1843–1847); Chair of the House Elections Committee (1845–1847); U.S. Senate (1848–1857, 1857–1861); Chair of the Senate Commerce Committee (1849–1856); Chair of the Senate Printing Committee (1852–1853); Governor of Maine (1857); Higher education: None	Hannibal Hamlin of ME (1809–1891) (1860)
Abraham Lincoln of IL (1809–1865)	Prior public experience: Illinois House of Representatives (1834–1842); U.S. House of Representatives (1847–1849); President (1861–1865); Higher education: None	Prior public experience: Tennessee House of Representatives (1835–1837, 1839–1841); Tennessee Senate (1841–1843); U.S. House of Representatives (1843–1853); Chair of the House Public Expenditures Committee (1849–1852); Governor of Tennessee (1853–1857, 1862–1865); U.S. Senate (1857–1862); Chair of the Senate Audit Committee (1859–1861); Higher education: None	Andrew Johnson of TN (1808–1875) (1864)
Opponent(s); Stephen A. Douglas (Democratic); John C. Breckinridge (Southern Democrats); John Bell (Constitutional Union)	Electoral vote: Lincoln/Hamlin: 180 (59.4%); Breckinridge/Lane: 72 (23.8%); Bell/Everett: 39 (12.9%); Douglas/Johnson: 12 (4.0%); Popular vote: Lincoln/Hamlin: 1,865,908 (39.7%); Douglas/Johnson: 1,380,202 (29.5%); Breckinridge/Lane: 848,019 (18.2%); Bell/Everett: 590,901 (12.7%)		Opponent(s); Herschel Vespasian Johnson (Democratic); Joseph Lane (Southern Democrats); Edward Everett (Constitutional Union)
Opponent(s); George B. McClellan (Democratic)	Electoral vote: Lincoln/Johnson: 212 (91.0%); McClellan/Pendleton: 21 (9.0%); Popular vote: Lincoln/Johnson: 2,218,388 (55.0%); McClellan/Pendleton: 1,812,807 (45.0%)		Opponent(s); George H. Pendleton (Democratic)

=== 1868, 1872 ===
Presidential nominee	1868 (won), 1872 (won)		Vice presidential nominee
Ulysses S. Grant of IL (1822–1885)	Prior public experience: Commanding General of the U.S. Army (1864–1869); Acting U.S. Secretary of War (1867–1868); President (1869–1877); Higher education: U.S. Military Academy (BS)	Prior public experience: U.S. House of Representatives (1855–1869); Chair of the House Post Office Committee (1859–1863); Speaker of the U.S. House of Representatives (1863–1869); Higher education: None	Schuyler Colfax of IN (1823–1885) (1868)
Ulysses S. Grant of IL (1822–1885)	Prior public experience: Commanding General of the U.S. Army (1864–1869); Acting U.S. Secretary of War (1867–1868); President (1869–1877); Higher education: U.S. Military Academy (BS)	Prior public experience: Massachusetts House of Representatives (1841–1842); Massachusetts Senate (1844–1846, 1850–1852); President of the Massachusetts Senate (1851–1852); U.S. Senate (1855–1873); Chair of the Senate Military Affairs Committee (1861–1873); Higher education: None	Henry Wilson of MA (1812–1875) (1872)
Opponent(s); Horatio Seymour (Democratic)	Electoral vote: Grant/Colfax: 214 (72.8%); Seymour/Blair: 80 (27.2%); Popular vote: Grant/Colfax: 3,013,421 (52.7%); Seymour/Blair: 2,706,829 (47.3%)		Opponent(s); Francis Preston Blair Jr. (Democratic)
Opponent(s); Horace Greeley (Democratic)	Electoral vote: Grant/Wilson: 286 (81.3%); Greeley/Brown: 66 (18.8%)*; Popular vote: Grant/Wilson: 3,598,235 (55.6%); Greeley/Brown: 2,834,761 (43.8%)		Opponent(s); Benjamin Gratz Brown (Democratic)

=== 1876 ===
Presidential nominee	1876 (won)		Vice presidential nominee
Rutherford B. Hayes of OH (1822–1893)	Prior public experience: U.S. House of Representatives (1865–1867); Governor of Ohio (1868–1872, 1876–1877); Higher education: Kenyon College (BA); Harvard University (LLB)	Prior public experience: New York Assembly (1850–1851); New York Senate (1858–1859); U.S. House of Representatives (1861–1877); Chair of the House War Department Expenditures Committee (1861–1863); Chair of the House Commerce Committee (1873–1875); Higher education: University of Vermont (BA)	William A. Wheeler of NY (1819–1887)
Opponent(s); Samuel J. Tilden (Democratic)	Electoral vote: Hayes/Wheeler: 185 (50.1%); Tilden/Hendricks: 184 (49.9%); Popular vote: Tilden/Hendricks: 4,288,546 (50.9%); Hayes/Wheeler: 4,034,311 (47.9%)		Opponent(s); Thomas A. Hendricks (Democratic)

=== 1880 ===
Presidential nominee	1880 (won)		Vice presidential nominee
James A. Garfield of OH (1831–1881)	Prior public experience: Ohio Senate (1859–1861); U.S. House of Representatives (1863–1881); Chair of the House Military Affairs Committee (1867–1869); Chair of the House Banking Committee (1869–1871); Chair of the House Appropriations Committee (1871–1875); Higher education: Hiram College (attended); Williams College (BA)	Prior public experience: Collector of the Port of New York (1871–1878); Chair of the New York Republican Party (1879–1881); Higher education: Union College (attended); State and National Law School (attended)	Chester A. Arthur of NY (1829–1886)
Opponent(s); Winfield Scott Hancock (Democratic); James B. Weaver (Greenback)	Electoral vote: Garfield/Arthur: 214 (58.0%); Hancock/English: 155 (42.0%); Popular vote: Garfield/Arthur: 4,446,158 (48.3%); Hancock/English: 4,444,260 (48.2%); Weaver/Chambers: 308,649 (3.4%)		Opponent(s); William Hayden English (Democratic); Barzillai J. Chambers (Greenback)

=== 1884 ===
Presidential nominee	1884 (lost)		Vice presidential nominee
James G. Blaine of ME (1830–1893)	Prior public experience: Maine House of Representatives (1859–1862); Speaker of the Maine House of Representatives (1861–1862); U.S. House of Representatives (1863–1876); Speaker of the U.S. House of Representatives (1869–1875); Chair of the House Rules Committee (1873–1876); U.S. Senate (1876–1881); Chair of the Senate Civil Service Committee (1877); Chair of the Senate Rules Committee (1877–1879); U.S. Secretary of State (1881); Higher education: Washington and Jefferson College (BA)	Prior public experience: Illinois House of Representatives (1852–1853, 1856–1857); U.S. House of Representatives (1859–1862, 1867–1871); Chair of the House Unfinished Business Committee (1859–1862); Chair of the House Armed Services Committee (1869–1871); U.S. Senate (1871–1877, 1879–1886); Chair of the Senate Armed Services Committee (1872–1877, 1881–1886); Higher education: Shiloh College (attended); University of Louisville (LLB)	John A. Logan of IL (1826–1886)
Opponent(s); Grover Cleveland (Democratic); John St. John (Prohibition); Benjamin Butler (Greenback)	Electoral vote: Cleveland/Hendricks: 219 (54.6%); Blaine/Logan: 182 (45.4%); Popular vote: Cleveland/Hendricks: 4,914,482 (48.9%); Blaine/Logan: 4,856,905 (48.3%); St. John/Daniel: 147,482 (1.5%); Butler/West: 134,294 (1.3%)		Opponent(s); Thomas A. Hendricks (Democratic); William Daniel (Prohibition); Absolom M. West (Greenback)

=== 1888, 1892 ===
Presidential nominee	1888 (won), 1892 (lost)		Vice presidential nominee
Benjamin Harrison of IN (1833–1901)	Prior public experience: U.S. Senate (1881–1887); Chair of the Senate Seaboard Transportation Routes Committee (1881–1883); Chair of the Senate Territories Committee (1884–1887); President (1889–1893); Higher education: Ohio Military Institute (attended); Miami University (BA)	Prior public experience: U.S. House of Representatives (1879–1881); U.S. Minister to France (1881–1885); Higher education: None	Levi Morton of NY (1824–1920) (1888)
Benjamin Harrison of IN (1833–1901)	Prior public experience: U.S. Senate (1881–1887); Chair of the Senate Seaboard Transportation Routes Committee (1881–1883); Chair of the Senate Territories Committee (1884–1887); President (1889–1893); Higher education: Ohio Military Institute (attended); Miami University (BA)	Prior public experience: U.S. Minister to France (1889–1892); Higher education: None	Whitelaw Reid of NY (1837–1912) (1892)
Opponent(s); Grover Cleveland (Democratic); Clinton Fisk (Prohibition); Alson Streeter (Union Labor)	Electoral vote: Harrison/Morton: 233 (58.1%); Cleveland/Thurman: 168 (41.9%); Popular vote: Cleveland/Thurman: 5,534,488 (48.6%); Harrison/Morton: 5,443,892 (47.8%); Fisk/Brooks: 249,819 (2.2%); Streeter/Cunningham: 146,602 (1.3%)		Opponent(s); Allen Thurman (Democratic); John Brooks (Prohibition); Charles Cunningham (Union Labor)
Opponent(s); Grover Cleveland (Democratic); James Weaver (Populist); John Bidwell (Prohibition)	Electoral vote: Cleveland/Stevenson: 277 (62.4%); Harrison/Reid: 145 (32.7%); Weaver/Field: 22 (5.0%); Popular vote: Cleveland/Stevenson: 5,556,918 (46.0%); Harrison/Reid: 5,176,108 (43.0%); Weaver/Field: 1,041,028 (8.5%); Bidwell/Cranfill: 270,879 (2.2%)		Opponent(s); Adlai Stevenson (Democratic); James Field (Populist); James Cranfill (Prohibition)

=== 1896, 1900 ===
Presidential nominee	1896 (won), 1900 (won)		Vice presidential nominee
William McKinley of OH (1843–1901)	Prior public experience: U.S. House of Representatives (1877–1884, 1885–1891); Chair of the House Laws Revision Committee (1882–1883); Chair of the House Ways and Means Committee (1889–1891); Governor of Ohio (1892–1896); President (1897–1901); Higher education: Allegheny College (attended); University of Mount Union (attended); Albany Law School (attended)	Prior public experience: Chair of the New Jersey Republican Party (1880–1891); New Jersey General Assembly (1873–1875); Speaker of the New Jersey General Assembly (1874–1875); New Jersey Senate (1877–1883); President of the New Jersey Senate (1881–1883); Higher education: Rutgers University, New Brunswick (BA)	Garret Hobart of NJ (1844–1899) (1896)
William McKinley of OH (1843–1901)	Prior public experience: U.S. House of Representatives (1877–1884, 1885–1891); Chair of the House Laws Revision Committee (1882–1883); Chair of the House Ways and Means Committee (1889–1891); Governor of Ohio (1892–1896); President (1897–1901); Higher education: Allegheny College (attended); University of Mount Union (attended); Albany Law School (attended)	Prior public experience: New York Assembly (1882–1884); Minority Leader of the New York Assembly (1883); United States Civil Service Commission (1889–1895); Police Commissioner of New York City (1895–1897); Assistant Secretary of the Navy (1897–1898); Governor of New York (1899–1900); Higher education: Harvard University (BA); Columbia University (attended)	Theodore Roosevelt of NY (1858–1919) (1900)
Opponent(s); William Jennings Bryan (Democratic, Populist)	Electoral vote (President): McKinley: 271 (60.6%); Bryan: 176 (39.4%); Electoral vote (Vice President): Hobart: 271 (60.6%); Sewall: 149 (33.3%); Watson: 27 (6.0%); Popular vote: McKinley/Hobart: 7,102,246 (51.0%); Bryan/Sewall-Watson: 6,492,559 (46.7%)		Opponent(s); Arthur Sewall (Democratic); Tom Watson (Populist)
Opponent(s); William Jennings Bryan (Democratic, Populist); John Woolley (Prohibition)	Electoral vote: McKinley/Roosevelt: 292 (65.3%); Bryan/Stevenson: 155 (34.7%); Popular vote: McKinley/Roosevelt: 7,228,864 (51.6%); Bryan/Stevenson: 6,370,932 (45.5%); Woolley/Metcalf: 210,864 (1.5%)		Opponent(s); Adlai Stevenson (Democratic); Henry Metcalf (Prohibition)

== 20th century ==
=== 1904 ===
Presidential nominee	1904 (won)		Vice presidential nominee
Theodore Roosevelt of NY (1858–1919)	Prior public experience: New York Assembly (1882–1884); Minority Leader of the New York Assembly (1883); United States Civil Service Commission (1889–1895); Police Commissioner of New York City (1895–1897); Assistant Secretary of the Navy (1897–1898); Governor of New York (1899–1900); Vice President (1901); President (1901–1909); Higher education: Harvard University (BA); Columbia University (attended)	Prior public experience: U.S. Senate (1897–1905); Chair of the Senate Immigration Committee (1897–1899); Chair of the Senate Public Buildings Committee (1899–1905); Higher education: Ohio Wesleyan University (BA, MA)	Charles Fairbanks of IN (1852–1918)
Opponent(s); Alton Parker (Democratic); Gene Debs (Socialist); Silas Swallow (Prohibition)	Electoral vote: Roosevelt/Fairbanks: 336 (70.6%); Parker/Davis: 140 (29.4%); Popular vote: Roosevelt/Fairbanks: 7,630,457 (56.4%); Parker/Davis: 5,083,880 (37.6%); Debs/Hanford: 402,810 (3.0%); Swallow/Carroll: 259,102 (1.9%)		Opponent(s); Henry Davis (Democratic); Ben Hanford (Socialist); George Carroll (Prohibition)

=== 1908, 1912 ===
Presidential nominee	1908 (won), 1912 (lost)		Vice presidential nominee
William Taft of OH (1857–1930)	Prior public experience: U.S. Solicitor General (1890–1892); Judge of the U.S. Court of Appeals for the Sixth Circuit (1892–1900); Governor-General of the Philippines (1901–1903); U.S. Secretary of War (1904–1908); Acting Governor of Cuba (1906); President (1909–1913); Higher education: Yale University (BA); University of Cincinnati (LLB)	Prior public experience: Mayor of Utica, NY (1884–1885); U.S. House of Representatives (1887–1891, 1893–1909); Chair of the House Justice Department Expenditures Committee (1889–1891); Chair of the House Indian Affairs Committee (1895–1909); Vice President (1909–1912); Higher education: Hamilton College, New York (BA)	James S. Sherman of NY (1855–1912) (1908, 1912)
William Taft of OH (1857–1930)	Prior public experience: U.S. Solicitor General (1890–1892); Judge of the U.S. Court of Appeals for the Sixth Circuit (1892–1900); Governor-General of the Philippines (1901–1903); U.S. Secretary of War (1904–1908); Acting Governor of Cuba (1906); President (1909–1913); Higher education: Yale University (BA); University of Cincinnati (LLB)	Prior public experience: None; Higher education: Columbia University (BA, MA, PhD)	Nicholas Butler of NY (1862–1947) (1912)
Opponent(s); William Jennings Bryan (Democratic); Gene Debs (Socialist); Eugene Chafin (Prohibition)	Electoral vote: Taft/Sherman: 321 (66.5%); Bryan/Kern: 162 (33.5%); Popular vote: Taft/Sherman: 7,678,335 (51.6%); Bryan/Kern: 6,408,979 (43.0%); Debs/Hanford: 420,852 (2.8%); Chafin/Watkins: 254,087 (1.7%)		Opponent(s); John Kern (Democratic); Ben Hanford (Socialist); Aaron Watkins (Prohibition)
Opponent(s); Woodrow Wilson (Democratic); Theodore Roosevelt (Progressive); Eugene Debs (Socialist); Eugene Chafin (Prohibition)	Electoral vote: Wilson/Marshall: 435 (81.9%); Roosevelt/Johnson: 88 (16.6%); Taft/Butler: 8 (1.5%); Popular vote: Wilson/Marshall: 6,296,284 (41.8%); Roosevelt/Johnson: 4,122,721 (24.7%); Taft/Butler: 3,486,242 (23.2%); Debs/Seidel: 901,551 (6.0%); Chafin/Watkins: 208,156 (1.7%)		Opponent(s); Thomas Marshall (Democratic); Hiram Johnson (Progressive); Emil Seidel (Socialist); Aaron Watkins (Prohibition)

=== 1916 ===
Presidential nominee	1916 (lost)		Vice presidential nominee
Charles Hughes of NY (1862–1948)	Prior public experience: Governor of New York (1907–1910); Associate Justice of the U.S. Supreme Court (1910–1916); Higher education: Colgate University (attended); Brown University (BA); Columbia University (LLB)	Prior public experience: U.S. Senate (1897–1905); Chair of the Senate Immigration Committee (1897–1899); Chair of the Senate Public Buildings Committee (1899–1905); Vice President (1905–1909); Higher education: Ohio Wesleyan University (BA, MA)	Charles Fairbanks of IN (1852–1918)
Opponent(s); Woodrow Wilson (Democratic); Allan Benson (Socialist); Frank Hanly (Prohibition)	Electoral vote: Wilson/Marshall: 277 (52.2%); Hughes/Fairbanks: 254 (47.8%); Popular vote: Wilson/Marshall: 9,126,868 (49.2%); Hughes/Fairbanks: 8,548,728 (46.1%); Benson/Kirkpatrick: 590,524 (3.2%); Hanly/Landrith: 221,302 (1.2%)		Opponent(s); Thomas Marshall (Democratic); Kirk Kirkpatrick (Socialist); Ira Landrith (Prohibition)

=== 1920 ===
Presidential nominee	1920 (won)		Vice presidential nominee
Warren G. Harding of OH (1865–1923)	Prior public experience: Ohio Senate (1900–1904); Lieutenant Governor of Ohio (1904–1906); U.S. Senate (1915–1921); Higher education: Ohio Central College (BA)	Prior public experience: Massachusetts House of Representatives (1907–1908); Massachusetts Senate (1912–1915); President of the Massachusetts Senate (1914–1915); Lieutenant Governor of Massachusetts (1916–1919); Governor of Massachusetts (1919–1921); Higher education: Amherst College (BA)	Calvin Coolidge of MA (1872–1933)
Opponent(s); James Cox (Democratic); Gene Debs (Socialist); Parley Christensen (Farmer-Labor)	Electoral vote: Harding/Coolidge: 404 (76.1%); Cox/Roosevelt: 127 (23.9%); Popular vote: Harding/Coolidge: 16,144,093 (60.3%); Cox/Roosevelt: 9,139,661 (34.2%); Debs/Stedman: 913,693 (3.4%); Christensen/Hayes: 265,398 (1.0%)		Opponent(s); Franklin D. Roosevelt (Democratic); Stedy Stedman (Socialist); Max Hayes (Farmer-Labor)

=== 1924 ===
Presidential nominee	1924 (won)		Vice presidential nominee
Calvin Coolidge of MA (1872–1933)	Prior public experience: Massachusetts House of Representatives (1907–1908); Massachusetts Senate (1912–1915); President of the Massachusetts Senate (1914–1915); Lieutenant Governor of Massachusetts (1916–1919); Governor of Massachusetts (1919–1921); Vice President (1921–1923); President (1923–1929); Higher education: Amherst College (BA)	Prior public experience: Comptroller of the Currency (1898–1901); Director of the U.S. Bureau of the Budget (1921–1922); Higher education: Marietta College (BA); University of Cincinnati (LLB)	Charles Dawes of IL (1865–1951)
Opponent(s); John Davis (Democratic); Bob La Follette (Progressive)	Electoral vote: Coolidge/Dawes: 382 (71.9%); Davis/Bryan: 136 (25.6%); La Follette/Wheeler: 13 (2.4%); Popular vote: Coolidge/Dawes: 15,723,789 (54.0%); Davis/Bryan: 8,386,242 (28.8%); La Follette/Wheeler: 4,831,706 (16.6%)		Opponent(s); Charles Bryan (Democratic); Burton Wheeler (Progressive)

=== 1928, 1932 ===
Presidential nominee	1928 (won), 1932 (lost)		Vice presidential nominee
Herbert Hoover of CA (1874–1964)	Prior public experience: Director of the U.S. Food Administration (1917–1918); U.S. Secretary of Commerce (1921–1928); President (1929–1933); Higher education: Stanford University (BS)	Prior public experience: U.S. House of Representatives (1893–1907); Chair of the House Interior Expenditures Committee (1895–1903); U.S. Senate (1907–1913, 1915–1929); Chair of the Senate Indian Depredations Committee (1907–1911); Secretary of the Senate Republican Conference (1911–1913); Chair of the Senate Coast Defenses Committee (1911–1913); President pro tempore of the U.S. Senate (1911); Senate Minority Whip (1915–1919); Senate Majority Whip (1919–1924); Chair of the Senate Rules Committee (1921–1929); Senate Majority Leader (1924–1929); Chair of the Joint Inaugural Ceremonies Committee (1924–1925); Vice President (1929–1933); Higher education: None	Charles Curtis of KS (1860–1936)
Opponent(s); Al Smith (Democratic)	Electoral vote: Hoover/Curtis: 444 (83.6%); Smith/Robinson: 87 (16.4%); Popular vote: Hoover/Curtis: 21,427,123: (58.2%); Smith/Robinson: 15,015,464 (40.8%)		Opponent(s); Joe Robinson (Democratic)
Opponent(s); Franklin D. Roosevelt (Democratic); Norman Thomas (Socialist)	Electoral vote: Roosevelt/Garner: 472 (88.9%); Hoover/Curtis: 59 (11.1%); Popular vote: Roosevelt/Garner: 22,821,277 (57.4%); Hoover/Curtis: 15,761,254 (39.7%); Thomas/Maurer: 884,885 (2.2%)		Opponent(s); Jack Garner (Democratic); James Maurer (Socialist)

=== 1936 ===
Presidential nominee	1936 (lost)		Vice presidential nominee
Alf Landon of KS (1887–1987)	Prior public experience: Chair of the Kansas Republican Party (1928–1930); Governor of Kansas (1933–1937); Higher education: University of Kansas, Lawrence (LLB)	Prior public experience: None; Higher education: Alma College (BA)	Frank Knox of IL (1874–1944)
Opponent(s); Franklin D. Roosevelt (Democratic); William Lemke (Union)	Electoral vote: Roosevelt/Garner: 523 (98.5%); Landon/Knox: 8 (1.5%); Popular vote: Roosevelt/Garner: 27,752,648 (60.8%); Landon/Knox: 16,681,862 (36.5%); Lemke/O'Brien: 892,378 (2.0%)		Opponent(s); Jack Garner (Democratic); Thomas O'Brien (Union)

=== 1940 ===
Presidential nominee	1940 (lost)		Vice presidential nominee
Wendell Willkie of NY (1892–1944)	Prior public experience: None; Higher education: Indiana University, Bloomington (BA, LLB)	Prior public experience: Associate Justice of the Oregon Supreme Court (1913–1915); U.S. Senate (1917–1918, 1918–1944); Chair of the Arid Lands Committee (1919–1926); Chair of the Senate Agriculture Committee (1926–1933); Senate Minority Leader (1933–1940); Higher education: Stanford University (attended)	Charles McNary of OR (1874–1944)
Opponent(s); Franklin D. Roosevelt (Democratic)	Electoral vote: Roosevelt/Wallace: 449 (84.6%); Willkie/McNary: 82 (15.4%); Popular vote: Roosevelt/Wallace 27,313,945: (54.7%); Willkie/McNary: (44.8%)		Opponent(s); Henry Wallace (Democratic)

=== 1944, 1948 ===
Presidential nominee	1944 (lost), 1948 (lost)		Vice presidential nominee
Thomas E. Dewey of NY (1902–1971)	Prior public experience: Acting U.S. Attorney for the Southern District of New York (1933); District Attorney of New York County, NY (1938–1941); Governor of New York (1943–1954); Higher education: University of Michigan (BA); Columbia University (JD)	Prior public experience: Attorney General of Ohio (1933–1937); Governor of Ohio (1939–1945); Higher education: Ohio State University (BA, LLB)	John W. Bricker of OH (1893–1986) (1944)
Thomas E. Dewey of NY (1902–1971)	Prior public experience: Acting U.S. Attorney for the Southern District of New York (1933); District Attorney of New York County, NY (1938–1941); Governor of New York (1943–1954); Higher education: University of Michigan (BA); Columbia University (JD)	Prior public experience: District Attorney of Alameda County, CA (1925–1939); Chair of the California Republican Party (1932–1938); Attorney General of California (1939–1943); Governor of California (1943–1953); Higher education: University of California, Berkeley (BA, JD)	Earl Warren of CA (1891–1974) (1948)
Opponent(s); Franklin D. Roosevelt (Democratic)	Electoral vote: Roosevelt/Truman: 432 (81.4%); Dewey/Bricker: 99 (18.6%); Popular vote: Roosevelt/Truman: 25,612,916 (53.4%); Dewey/Bricker: 22,017,929 (45.3%)		Opponent(s); Harry S. Truman (Democratic)
Opponent(s); Harry S. Truman (Democratic); Strom Thurmond (Dixiecrat); Henry Wallace (Progressive)	Electoral vote: Truman/Barkley: 303 (57.1%); Dewey/Warren: 189 (35.6%); Thurmond/Wright: 39 (7.3%); Popular vote: Truman/Barkley: 24,179,347 (49.6%); Dewey/Warren: 21,991,292 (45.1%); Thurmond/Wright: 1,175,930 (2.4%); Wallace/Taylor: 1,157,328 (2.3%)		Opponent(s); Alben Barkley (Democratic); Fielding Wright (Dixiecrat); Glen Taylor (Progressive)

=== 1952, 1956 ===
Presidential nominee	1952 (won), 1956 (won)		Vice presidential nominee
Dwight D. Eisenhower of NY (1952), PA (1956) (1890–1969)	Prior public experience: Commanding General of the U.S. Army Europe (1942–1943, 1944–1945); Governor of the American Zone of Occupied Germany (1945); Chief of Staff of the U.S. Army (1945–1948); Supreme Allied Commander Europe (1951–1952); President (1953–1961); Higher education: U.S. Military Academy (BS)	Prior public experience: U.S. House of Representatives (1947–1950); Ranking Member of the House Un-American Activities Committee (1950); U.S. Senate (1950–1953); Vice President (1953–1961); Higher education: Whittier College (BA); Duke University (JD)	Richard Nixon of CA (1913–1994)
Opponent(s); Adlai Stevenson (Democratic)	Electoral vote: Eisenhower/Nixon: 442 (83.2%); Stevenson/Sparkman: 89 (16.8%); Popular vote: Eisenhower/Nixon: 34,075,529 (55.2%); Stevenson/Sparkman: 27,375,090 (44.2%)		Opponent(s); John Sparkman (Democratic)
Opponent(s); Adlai Stevenson (Democratic)	Electoral vote: Eisenhower/Nixon: 457 (86.1%); Stevenson/Kefauver: 73 (13.7%); Jones/Talmadge: 1 (0.2%); Popular vote: Eisenhower/Nixon: 35,579,180 (57.4%); Stevenson/Kefauver: 26,028,028 (42.0%)		Opponent(s); Estes Kefauver (Democratic)

=== 1960 ===
Presidential nominee	1960 (lost)		Vice presidential nominee
Richard Nixon of CA (1913–1994)	Prior public experience: U.S. House of Representatives (1947–1950); U.S. Senate (1950–1953); Vice President (1953–1961); Higher education: Whittier College (BA); Duke University (JD)	Prior public experience: Massachusetts House of Representatives (1933–1936); U.S. Ambassador to the United Nations (1953–1960); U.S. Senate (1937–1944, 1947–1953); Ranking Member of the Senate Rules Committee (1951–1953); Higher education: Harvard University (BA)	Henry Cabot Lodge of MA (1902–1985)
Opponent(s); John F. Kennedy (Democratic); Harry Byrd (Southern; Democrats)	Electoral vote (President): Kennedy: 303 (56.4%); Nixon: 219 (40.8%); Byrd: 15 (2.8%); Electoral vote (Vice President): Johnson: 303 (56.4%); Lodge: 219 (40.8%); Thurmond: 14 (2.6%); Goldwater: 1 (0.2%); Popular vote: Kennedy/Johnson: 34,220,984 (49.7%); Nixon/Lodge: 34,108,157 (49.6%); Byrd/Thurmond: 116,248 (0.2%)		Opponent(s); Lyndon Johnson (Democratic); Strom Thurmond (Southern; Democrats)

=== 1964 ===
Presidential nominee	1964 (lost)		Vice presidential nominee
Barry Goldwater of AZ (1909–1998)	Prior public experience: U.S. Senate (1953–1965); Chair of the National Republican Senatorial Committee (1955–1957, 1961–1963); Ranking Member of the Senate Labor Committee (1959–1965); Higher education: University of Arizona (attended)	Prior public experience: U.S. House of Representatives (1951–1953, 1953–1965); Chair of the National Republican Congressional Committee (1960–1961); Chair of the Republican National Committee (1961–1964); Higher education: University of Notre Dame (BA); Union University, New York (LLB)	William Miller of NY (1914–1983)
Opponent(s); Lyndon Johnson (Democratic)	Electoral vote: Johnson/Humphrey: 486 (90.3%); Goldwater/Miller: 52 (9.7%); Popular vote: Johnson/Humphrey: 43,127,041 (61.1%); Goldwater/Miller: 27,175,754 (38.5%)		Opponent(s); Hubert Humphrey (Democratic)

=== 1968, 1972 ===
Presidential nominee	1968 (won), 1972 (won)		Vice presidential nominee
Richard Nixon of NY (1968), CA (1972) (1913–1994)	Prior public experience: U.S. House of Representatives (1947–1950); U.S. Senate (1950–1953); Vice President (1953–1961); President (1969–1974); Higher education: Whittier College (BA); Duke University (JD)	Prior public experience: Executive of Baltimore County (1962–1966); Governor of Maryland (1967–1969); Vice President (1969–1973); Higher education: Johns Hopkins University (BA); University of Baltimore (LLB)	Spiro Agnew of MD (1918–1996)
Opponent(s); Hubert Humphrey (Democratic); George Wallace (American; Independent)	Electoral vote: Nixon/Agnew: 301 (55.9%); Humphrey/Muskie: 191 (35.5%); Wallace/LeMay: 46 (8.6%); Popular vote: Nixon/Agnew: 31,783,783 (43.4%); Humphrey/Muskie: 31,271,839 (42.7%); Wallace/LeMay: 9,901,118 (13.5%)		Opponent(s); Ed Muskie (Democratic); Curtis LeMay (American; Independent)
Opponent(s); George McGovern (Democratic); John Schmitz (American; Independent)	Electoral vote: Nixon/Agnew: 520 (96.7%); McGovern/Shriver: 17 (3.2%); Hospers/Nathan: 1 (0.2%); Popular vote: Nixon/Agnew: 47,168,710 (60.6%); McGovern/Shriver 29,173,222 (37.5%); Schmitz/Anderson: 1,100,868 (1.4%)		Opponent(s); Sargent Shriver (Democratic); Thomas Anderson (American; Independent)

=== 1976 ===
Presidential nominee	1976 (lost)		Vice presidential nominee
Gerald Ford of MI (1913–2006)	Prior public experience: U.S. House of Representatives (1949–1973); Chair of the House Republican Conference (1963–1965); House Minority Leader (1965–1973); Vice President (1973–1974); President (1974–1977); Higher education: University of Michigan (BA); Yale University (JD)	Prior public experience: Kansas House of Representatives (1951–1953); U.S. House of Representatives (1961–1969); U.S. Senate (1969–1996); Chair of the Republican National Committee (1971–1973); Higher education: University of Kansas, Lawrence (attended); University of Arizona (attended); Washburn University (BA, LLB)	Bob Dole of KS (1923–2021)
Opponent(s); Jimmy Carter (Democratic)	Electoral vote (President): Carter: 297 (55.2%); Ford: 240 (44.6%); Reagan: 1 (0.2%); Electoral vote (Vice President): Mondale: 297 (55.2%); Dole: 241 (44.8%); Popular vote: Carter/Mondale: 40,831,881 (50.1%); Ford/Dole: 39,148,634 (48.0%)		Opponent(s); Walter Mondale (Democratic)

=== 1980, 1984 ===
Presidential nominee	1980 (won), 1984 (won)		Vice presidential nominee
Ronald Reagan of CA (1911–2004)	Prior public experience: Governor of California (1967–1975); Chair of the Republican Governors Association (1968–1970); President (1981–1989); Higher education: Eureka College (BA)	Prior public experience: U.S. House of Representatives (1967–1971); U.S. Ambassador to the United Nations (1971–1973); Chair of the Republican National Committee (1973–1974); Chief of the U.S. Liaison Office to the People's Republic of China (1974–1975); Director of Central Intelligence (1976–1977); Vice President (1981–1989); Higher education: Yale University (BA)	George H. W. Bush of TX (1924–2018)
Opponent(s); Jimmy Carter (Democratic); John Anderson (Independent); Ed Clark (Libertarian)	Electoral vote: Reagan/Bush: 489 (90.9%); Carter/Mondale: 49 (9.1%); Popular vote: Reagan/Bush: 43,903,230 (50.8%); Carter/Mondale: 35,480,115 (41.0%); Anderson/Lucey: 5,719,850 (6.6%); Clark/Koch: 921,128 (1.1%)		Opponent(s); Walter Mondale (Democratic); Patrick Lucey (Independent); David Koch (Libertarian)
Opponent(s); Walter Mondale (Democratic)	Electoral vote: Reagan/Bush: 525 (97.6%); Mondale/Ferraro: 13 (2.4%); Popular vote: Reagan/Bush: 54,455,472 (58.8%); Mondale/Ferraro: 37,577,352 (40.6%)		Opponent(s); Geraldine Ferraro (Democratic)

=== 1988, 1992 ===
Presidential nominee	1988 (won), 1992 (lost)		Vice presidential nominee
George H. W. Bush of TX (1924–2018)	Prior public experience: U.S. House of Representatives (1967–1971); U.S. Ambassador to the United Nations (1971–1973); Chair of the Republican National Committee (1973–1974); Chief of the U.S. Liaison Office to the People's Republic of China (1974–1975); Director of Central Intelligence (1976–1977); Vice President (1981–1989); President (1989–1993); Higher education: Yale University (BA)	Prior public experience: U.S. House of Representatives (1977–1981); U.S. Senate (1981–1989); Chair of the Senate Committee System Study Committee (1984); Vice President (1989–1993); Higher education: DePauw University (BA); Indiana University, Indianapolis (JD)	Dan Quayle of IN (born 1947)
Opponent(s); Michael Dukakis (Democratic)	Electoral vote (President): Bush: 426 (79.2%); Dukakis: 111 (20.6%); Bentsen: 1 (0.2%); Electoral vote (Vice President): Quayle: 426 (79.2%); Bentsen: 111 (20.6%); Dukakis: 1 (0.2%); Popular vote: Bush/Quayle: 48,886,097 (53.4%); Dukakis/Bentsen: 41,809,074 (45.7%)		Opponent(s); Lloyd Bentsen (Democratic)
Opponent(s); Bill Clinton (Democratic); Ross Perot (Independent)	Electoral vote: Clinton/Gore: 370 (68.8%); Bush/Quayle: 168 (31.2%); Popular vote: Clinton/Gore: 44,909,806 (43.0%); Bush/Quayle: 39,104,550 (37.5%); Perot/Stockdale: 19,743,821 (18.9%)		Opponent(s); Al Gore (Democratic); James Stockdale (Independent)

=== 1996 ===
Presidential nominee	1996 (lost)		Vice presidential nominee
Bob Dole of KS (1923–2021)	Prior public experience: Kansas House of Representatives (1951–1953); U.S. House of Representatives (1961–1969); U.S. Senate (1969–1996); Ranking Member of the Senate Agriculture Committee (1975–1979); Chair of the Senate Finance Committee (1981–1985); Chair of the Senate Europe Security and Cooperation Committee (1983–1985); Senate Majority Leader (1985–1987, 1995–1996); Senate Minority Leader (1987–1995); Chair of the Republican National Committee (1971–1973); Higher education: University of Kansas (attended); University of Arizona (attended); Washburn University (BA, LLB)	Prior public experience: U.S. House of Representatives (1971–1989); Chair of the House Republican Conference (1981–1987); U.S. Secretary of Housing and Urban Development (1989–1993); Higher education: Occidental College (BA); California State University, Long Beach (attended); California Western University, San Diego (attended)	Jack Kemp of MD (1935–2009)
Opponent(s); Bill Clinton (Democratic); Ross Perot (Reform)	Electoral vote: Clinton/Gore: 379 (70.4%); Dole/Kemp: 159 (29.6%); Popular vote: Clinton/Gore: 47,401,185 (49.2%); Dole/Kemp: 39,197,469 (40.7%); Perot/Choate: 8,085,294 (8.4%)		Opponent(s); Al Gore (Democratic); Pat Choate (Reform)

== 21st century ==
=== 2000, 2004 ===
Presidential nominee	2000 (won), 2004 (won)		Vice presidential nominee
George W. Bush of TX (born 1946)	Prior public experience: Governor of Texas (1995–2000); President (2001–2009); Higher education: Yale University (BA); Harvard University (MBA)	Prior public experience: White House Chief of Staff (1975–1977); U.S. House of Representatives (1979–1989); Chair of the House Republican Policy Committee (1981–1987); Chair of the House Republican Conference (1987–1989); Ranking Member of the House Iran-Contra Committee (1987); House Minority Whip (1989); U.S. Secretary of Defense (1989–1993); Vice President (2001–2009); Higher education: Yale University (attended); University of Wyoming (BA, MA); University of Wisconsin, Madison (attended)	Dick Cheney of WY (1941–2025)
Opponent(s); Al Gore (Democratic); Ralph Nader (Green)	Electoral vote: Bush/Cheney: 271 (50.4%); Gore/Lieberman: 266 (49.4%); Popular vote: Gore/Lieberman: 50,999,897 (48.4%); Bush/Cheney: 50,456,002 (47.9%); Nader/LaDuke: 2,882,955 (2.7%)		Opponent(s); Joe Lieberman (Democratic); Winona LaDuke (Green)
Opponent(s); John Kerry (Democratic)	Electoral vote (President): Bush: 286 (53.2%); Kerry: 251 (46.7%); Edwards: 1 (0.2%); Electoral vote (Vice President): Cheney: 286 (53.2%); Edwards: 252 (46.8%); Popular vote: Bush/Cheney: 62,040,610 (50.7%); Kerry/Edwards: 59,028,444 (48.3%)		Opponent(s); John Edwards (Democratic)

=== 2008 ===
Presidential nominee	2008 (lost)		Vice presidential nominee
John McCain of AZ (1936–2018)	Prior public experience: U.S. House of Representatives (1983–1987); United States Senate (1987–2018); Chair of the Senate Indian Affairs Committee (1995–1997, 2005–2007); Chair of the Senate Commerce Committee (1997–2001, 2003–2005); Ranking Member of the Senate Commerce Committee (2001–2003); Ranking Member of the Senate Armed Services Committee (2007–2013); Higher education: United States Naval Academy (BS)	Prior public experience: Governor of Alaska (2006–2009); Higher education: University of Hawaii, Hilo (attended); Hawaii Pacific University (attended); North Idaho College (attended); Matanuska-Susitna College (attended); University of Idaho (BA)	Sarah Palin of AK (born 1964)
Opponent(s); Barack Obama (Democratic)	Electoral vote: Obama/Biden: 365 (67.8%); McCain/Palin: 173 (32.2%); Popular vote: Obama/Biden: 69,498,516 (52.9%); McCain/Palin: 59,948,323 (45.7%)		Opponent(s); Joe Biden (Democratic)

=== 2012 ===
Presidential nominee	2012 (lost)		Vice presidential nominee
Mitt Romney of MA (born 1947)	Prior public experience: Governor of Massachusetts (2003–2007); Chair of the Republican Governors Association (2005–2006); Higher education: Stanford University (attended); Brigham Young University (BA); Harvard University (JD, MBA)	Prior public experience: U.S. House of Representatives (1999–2019); Chair of the House Budget Committee (2011–2015); Higher education: Miami University (BA)	Paul Ryan of WI (born 1970)
Opponent(s); Barack Obama (Democratic)	Electoral vote: Obama/Biden: 332 (61.7%); Romney/Ryan: 206 (38.3%); Popular vote: Obama/Biden: 65,915,795 (51.1%); Romney/Ryan: 60,933,504 (47.2%); Johnson/Gray: 1,275,971 (1.0%)		Opponent(s); Joe Biden (Democratic)

=== 2016, 2020, 2024 ===
Presidential nominee	2016 (won), 2020 (lost), 2024 (won)		Vice presidential nominee
Donald Trump of NY (2016), FL (2020, 2024) (born 1946)	Prior public experience: President (2017–2021); Higher education: Fordham University (attended); University of Pennsylvania (BS)	Prior public experience: U.S. House of Representatives (2001–2013); Chair of the Republican Study Committee (2005–2007); Ranking Member of the House Voting Irregularities Committee (2007–2008); Chair of the House Republican Conference (2009–2011); Governor of Indiana (2013–2017); Vice President (2017–2021); Higher education: Hanover College (BA); Indiana University, Indianapolis (JD)	Mike Pence of IN (born 1959) (2016, 2020)
Donald Trump of NY (2016), FL (2020, 2024) (born 1946)	Prior public experience: President (2017–2021); Higher education: Fordham University (attended); University of Pennsylvania (BS)	Prior public experience: U.S. Senate (2023–2025); Higher education: Ohio State University (BA); Yale University (JD)	JD Vance of OH (born 1984) (2024)
Opponent(s); Hillary Clinton (Democratic); Gary Johnson (Libertarian); Jill Stein (Green)	Electoral vote (President): Trump: 304 (56.5%); Clinton: 227 (42.2%); Powell: 3 (0.6%); Kasich: 1 (0.2%); Paul: 1 (0.2%); Sanders: 1 (0.2%); Spotted Eagle: 1 (0.2%); Electoral vote (Vice President): Pence: 305 (56.7%); Kaine: 227 (42.2%); Warren: 2 (0.4%); Cantwell: 1 (0.2%); Collins: 1 (0.2%); Fiorina: 1 (0.2%); LaDuke: 1 (0.2%); Popular vote: Clinton/Kaine: 65,853,514 (48.2%); Trump/Pence: 62,984,828 (46.1%); Johnson/Weld: 4,489,341 (3.3%); Stein/Baraka: 1,457,218 (1.1%)		Opponent(s); Tim Kaine (Democratic); Bill Weld (Libertarian); Ajamu Baraka (Green)
Opponent(s); Joe Biden (Democratic); Jo Jorgensen (Libertarian)	Electoral vote: Biden/Harris: 306 (56.9%); Trump/Pence: 232 (43.1%); Popular vote: Biden/Harris: 81,268,924 (51.4%); Trump/Pence: 74,223,975 (46.9%); Jorgensen/Cohen: 1,865,535 (1.2%)		Opponent(s); Kamala Harris (Democratic); Spike Cohen (Libertarian)
Opponent(s); Kamala Harris (Democratic)	Electoral vote: Trump/Vance: 312 (58.0%); Harris/Walz: 226 (42.0%); Popular vote: Trump/Vance: 77,302,580 (49.8%); Harris/Walz: 75,017,613 (48.3%)		Opponent(s); Tim Walz (Democratic)

== See also ==
- List of Republican National Conventions
- History of the Republican Party (United States)
- List of United States National Republican and Whig Party presidential tickets
- List of United States Democratic Party presidential tickets
- List of Green Party of the United States presidential tickets
- List of United States Libertarian Party presidential tickets
