= List of vice presidents of the United States =

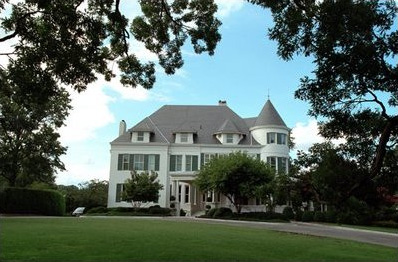
Number One Observatory Circle, the official residence of the vice president of the United States

The vice president of the United States is the second-highest officer in the executive branch of the United States federal government after the president of the United States. The vice president also serves as the president of the Senate and may choose to cast a tie-breaking vote on decisions made by the Senate. Vice presidents have exercised this latter power to varying extents over the years. Two vice presidents—George Clinton and John C. Calhoun—served under more than one president.

There have been 50 U.S. vice presidents since the office was created in 1789. The incumbent vice president is JD Vance, who assumed office as the 50th vice president on January 20, 2025. Originally, the vice president was the person who received the second-most votes for president in the Electoral College. But after the election of 1800 produced a tie between Thomas Jefferson and Aaron Burr, requiring the House of Representatives to choose between them, lawmakers acted to prevent such a situation from recurring. The Twelfth Amendment was added to the Constitution in 1804, creating the current system where electors cast a separate ballot for the vice presidency.

The vice president is the first person in the presidential line of succession—that is, they assume the presidency if the president dies, resigns, or is impeached and removed from office. Nine vice presidents have ascended to the presidency in this way. (Note: Eight (John Tyler, Millard Fillmore, Andrew Johnson, Chester A. Arthur, Theodore Roosevelt, Calvin Coolidge, Harry S. Truman, and Lyndon B. Johnson) through the president's death and one (Gerald Ford) through the president's resignation.) Also, six vice presidents have gone on to be elected as president in their own right. (Note: Four (John Adams, Thomas Jefferson, Martin Van Buren, George H. W. Bush) were the incumbent vice president at the time of their election, while two (Richard Nixon and Joe Biden) were elected president after the end of their tenure as vice president.)

Before adoption of the Twenty-fifth Amendment in 1967, an intra-term vacancy in the office of the vice president could not be filled until the next post-election inauguration. Sixteen of these vacancies occurred: seven vice presidents died, one resigned and eight succeeded to the presidency. This amendment allowed for a vacancy to be filled through appointment by the president and confirmation by both chambers of Congress. Since its ratification, the vice presidency has been vacant twice (both in the context of scandals surrounding the Nixon administration) and was filled both times through this process. The amendment also established a procedure whereby a vice president may, if the president is unable to discharge the powers and duties of the office, temporarily assume the powers and duties of the office as acting president. Three vice presidents have briefly acted as president under the 25th Amendment: George H. W. Bush on July 13, 1985; Dick Cheney on June 29, 2002, and on July 21, 2007; and Kamala Harris on November 19, 2021.

== Vice presidents ==
List of vice presidents of the United States from 1789 – till date.
No. (Note: Counted according to uninterrupted periods of time served by the same person. For example, John Adams served two consecutive terms and is counted as the first vice president.)	Portrait	Name (birth–death)	Term	Party (Note: Reflects the vice president's political party at the start of their vice presidency. Changes during their time in office are noted. Also reflects the president's political party unless otherwise noted beside the individual's name.)	Election	President
1		John Adams (1735–1826)	April 21, 1789 (Note: Due to logistical delays, John Adams assumed the vice presidency 1 month and 17 days after the March 4, 1789, scheduled start of operations of the new government under the Constitution. As a result, his first term was only 1,413 days long, and was the shortest term for a U.S. vice president who served a full term.) – March 4, 1797	Pro-Administration (Note: Pro-Administration is a contemporary term for the supporters of the political and economic policies of the Washington administration prior to the formation of the Federalist and Democratic–Republican parties.)	1788–89	George Washington (Note: George Washington remained unaffiliated with any political faction or party throughout his eight-year presidency.)
1		John Adams (1735–1826)	April 21, 1789 – March 4, 1797	Federalist	1792	George Washington
2		Thomas Jefferson (1743–1826)	March 4, 1797 – March 4, 1801	Democratic-Republican	1796	John Adams (Note: The 1796 presidential election resulted in a situation where the persons elected president and vice president belonged to opposing political parties. Federalist John Adams was elected president, and Thomas Jefferson of the Democratic-Republicans was elected vice president.)
3		Aaron Burr (1756–1836)	March 4, 1801 – March 4, 1805	Democratic-Republican	1800	Thomas Jefferson
4		George Clinton (Note: Died in office) (1739–1812)	March 4, 1805 – April 20, 1812	Democratic-Republican	1804	Thomas Jefferson
4		George Clinton (1739–1812)	March 4, 1805 – April 20, 1812	Democratic-Republican	1808	James Madison
—	Office vacant April 20, 1812 – March 4, 1813 (Note: Prior to ratification of the Twenty-fifth Amendment, February 10, 1967, an intra-term vacancy in the vice presidency could not be filled.)					James Madison
5		Elbridge Gerry (1744–1814)	March 4, 1813 – November 23, 1814	Democratic-Republican	1812	James Madison
—	Office vacant November 23, 1814 – March 4, 1817					James Madison
6		Daniel D. Tompkins (1774–1825)	March 4, 1817 – March 4, 1825	Democratic-Republican	1816	James Monroe
6		Daniel D. Tompkins (1774–1825)	March 4, 1817 – March 4, 1825	Democratic-Republican	1820	James Monroe
7		John C. Calhoun (Note: Resigned from office) (1782–1850)	March 4, 1825 – December 28, 1832	Democratic-Republican	1824	John Quincy Adams
7		John C. Calhoun (1782–1850)	March 4, 1825 – December 28, 1832	Nullifier (Note: Formerly a Democratic-Republican, Calhoun founded the Nullifier Party in 1828 but was brought on as Andrew Jackson's running mate in the 1828 election.)	1828	Andrew Jackson (Note: Andrew Jackson's supporters from the former Democratic-Republican Party, which had largely collapsed by the mid-1820s, began calling themselves 'Democrat' during his first term in office, thus marking the evolution of Thomas Jefferson's Democratic-Republican Party into the modern Democratic Party.)
—	Office vacant December 28, 1832 – March 4, 1833					Andrew Jackson
8		Martin Van Buren (1782–1862)	March 4, 1833 – March 4, 1837	Democratic	1832	Andrew Jackson
9		Richard Mentor Johnson (1780–1850)	March 4, 1837 – March 4, 1841	Democratic	1836	Martin Van Buren
10		John Tyler (Note: Succeeded to the presidency intra-term.) (1790–1862)	March 4, 1841 – April 4, 1841	Whig (Note: John Tyler was elected vice president on the Whig Party ticket in 1840 but was expelled from the party in September 1841.)	1840	William Henry Harrison
—	Office vacant April 4, 1841 – March 4, 1845					John Tyler
11		George M. Dallas (1792–1864)	March 4, 1845 – March 4, 1849	Democratic	1844	James K. Polk
12		Millard Fillmore (1800–1874)	March 4, 1849 – July 9, 1850	Whig	1848	Zachary Taylor
—	Office vacant July 9, 1850 – March 4, 1853					Millard Fillmore
13		William R. King (1786–1853)	March 4, 1853 (Note: King was inaugurated near Matanzas, in the Spanish colony of Cuba, twenty days after his term began (March 4) due to poor health. He was the first and only vice president of the United States to be sworn in on foreign soil.) – April 18, 1853	Democratic	1852	Franklin Pierce
—	Office vacant April 18, 1853 – March 4, 1857					Franklin Pierce
14		John C. Breckinridge (1821–1875)	March 4, 1857 – March 4, 1861	Democratic	1856	James Buchanan
15		Hannibal Hamlin (1809–1891)	March 4, 1861 – March 4, 1865	Republican	1860	Abraham Lincoln
16		Andrew Johnson (1808–1875)	March 4, 1865 – April 15, 1865	National Union (Note: Lincoln formed a bipartisan electoral alliance with War Democrats by selecting Democrat Andrew Johnson as his running mate, and running on the National Union Party ticket. Later, while president, Johnson tried and failed to build a party of loyalists under the National Union banner. Near the end of his presidency, Johnson rejoined the Democratic Party.)	1864	Abraham Lincoln
—	Office vacant April 15, 1865 – March 4, 1869					Andrew Johnson
17		Schuyler Colfax (1823–1885)	March 4, 1869 – March 4, 1873	Republican	1868	Ulysses S. Grant
18		Henry Wilson (1812–1875)	March 4, 1873 – November 22, 1875	Republican	1872	Ulysses S. Grant
—	Office vacant November 22, 1875 – March 4, 1877					Ulysses S. Grant
19		William A. Wheeler (1819–1887)	March 4, 1877 – March 4, 1881	Republican	1876	Rutherford B. Hayes
20		Chester A. Arthur (1829–1886)	March 4, 1881 – September 19, 1881	Republican	1880	James A. Garfield
—	Office vacant September 19, 1881 – March 4, 1885					Chester A. Arthur
21		Thomas A. Hendricks (1819–1885)	March 4, 1885 – November 25, 1885	Democratic	1884	Grover Cleveland
—	Office vacant November 25, 1885 – March 4, 1889					Grover Cleveland
22		Levi P. Morton (1824–1920)	March 4, 1889 – March 4, 1893	Republican	1888	Benjamin Harrison
23		Adlai Stevenson I (1835–1914)	March 4, 1893 – March 4, 1897	Democratic	1892	Grover Cleveland
24		Garret Hobart (1844–1899)	March 4, 1897 – November 21, 1899	Republican	1896	William McKinley
—	Office vacant November 21, 1899 – March 4, 1901					William McKinley
25		Theodore Roosevelt (1858–1919)	March 4, 1901 – September 14, 1901	Republican	1900	William McKinley
—	Office vacant September 14, 1901 – March 4, 1905					Theodore Roosevelt
26		Charles W. Fairbanks (1852–1918)	March 4, 1905 – March 4, 1909	Republican	1904	Theodore Roosevelt
27		James S. Sherman (1855–1912)	March 4, 1909 – October 30, 1912	Republican	1908	William Howard Taft
—	Office vacant October 30, 1912 – March 4, 1913					William Howard Taft
28		Thomas R. Marshall (1854–1925)	March 4, 1913 – March 4, 1921	Democratic	1912	Woodrow Wilson
28		Thomas R. Marshall (1854–1925)	March 4, 1913 – March 4, 1921	Democratic	1916	Woodrow Wilson
29		Calvin Coolidge (1872–1933)	March 4, 1921 – August 2, 1923	Republican	1920	Warren G. Harding
—	Office vacant August 2, 1923 – March 4, 1925					Calvin Coolidge
30		Charles G. Dawes (1865–1951)	March 4, 1925 – March 4, 1929	Republican	1924	Calvin Coolidge
31		Charles Curtis (1860–1936)	March 4, 1929 – March 4, 1933	Republican	1928	Herbert Hoover
32		John Nance Garner (1868–1967)	March 4, 1933 – January 20, 1941	Democratic	1932	Franklin D. Roosevelt
32		John Nance Garner (1868–1967)	March 4, 1933 – January 20, 1941	Democratic	1936	Franklin D. Roosevelt
33		Henry A. Wallace (1888–1965)	January 20, 1941 – January 20, 1945	Democratic	1940	Franklin D. Roosevelt
34		Harry S. Truman (1884–1972)	January 20, 1945 – April 12, 1945	Democratic	1944	Franklin D. Roosevelt
—	Office vacant April 12, 1945 – January 20, 1949					Harry S. Truman
35		Alben W. Barkley (1877–1956)	January 20, 1949 – January 20, 1953	Democratic	1948	Harry S. Truman
36		Richard Nixon (1913–1994)	January 20, 1953 – January 20, 1961	Republican	1952	Dwight D. Eisenhower
36		Richard Nixon (1913–1994)	January 20, 1953 – January 20, 1961	Republican	1956	Dwight D. Eisenhower
37		Lyndon B. Johnson (1908–1973)	January 20, 1961 – November 22, 1963	Democratic	1960	John F. Kennedy
—	Office vacant November 22, 1963 – January 20, 1965					Lyndon B. Johnson
38		Hubert Humphrey (1911–1978)	January 20, 1965 – January 20, 1969	Democratic	1964	Lyndon B. Johnson
39		Spiro Agnew (1918–1996)	January 20, 1969 – October 10, 1973	Republican	1968	Richard Nixon
39		Spiro Agnew (1918–1996)	January 20, 1969 – October 10, 1973	Republican	1972	Richard Nixon
—	Office vacant October 10 – December 6, 1973 (Note: The Twenty-fifth Amendment established a process whereby an intra-term vacancy in the vice presidency is filled by presidential appointment.)					Richard Nixon
40 (Note: Following the resignation of Spiro Agnew, the 39th vice president. Gerald Ford became the 40th vice president, appointed to fill out Agnew's second term. Instead he served only eight months, then succeeded to the presidency.)		Gerald Ford (1913–2006)	December 6, 1973 – August 9, 1974	Republican	1973 (Note: Vice presidential confirmation by the United States Congress, rather than a direct election.)	Richard Nixon
—	Office vacant August 9 – December 19, 1974					Gerald Ford
41 (Note: After Ford succeeded to the presidency later in that same term, Nelson Rockefeller became the 41st vice president and served out the remainder of the term.)		Nelson Rockefeller (1908–1979)	December 19, 1974 – January 20, 1977	Republican	1974	Gerald Ford
42		Walter Mondale (1928–2021)	January 20, 1977 – January 20, 1981	Democratic	1976	Jimmy Carter
43		George H. W. Bush (1924–2018)	January 20, 1981 – January 20, 1989	Republican	1980	Ronald Reagan
43		George H. W. Bush (1924–2018)	January 20, 1981 – January 20, 1989	Republican	1984	Ronald Reagan
44		Dan Quayle (b. 1947)	January 20, 1989 – January 20, 1993	Republican	1988	George H. W. Bush
45		Al Gore (b. 1948)	January 20, 1993 – January 20, 2001	Democratic	1992	Bill Clinton
45		Al Gore (b. 1948)	January 20, 1993 – January 20, 2001	Democratic	1996	Bill Clinton
46		Dick Cheney (1941–2025)	January 20, 2001 – January 20, 2009	Republican	2000	George W. Bush
46		Dick Cheney (1941–2025)	January 20, 2001 – January 20, 2009	Republican	2004	George W. Bush
47		Joe Biden (b. 1942)	January 20, 2009 – January 20, 2017	Democratic	2008	Barack Obama
47		Joe Biden (b. 1942)	January 20, 2009 – January 20, 2017	Democratic	2012	Barack Obama
48		Mike Pence (b. 1959)	January 20, 2017 – January 20, 2021	Republican	2016	Donald Trump
49		Kamala Harris (b. 1964)	January 20, 2021 – January 20, 2025	Democratic	2020	Joe Biden
50		JD Vance (b. 1984)	January 20, 2025 – Incumbent	Republican	2024	Donald Trump

== See also ==
- Acting President of the United States
- Founding Fathers of the United States
- List of presidents of the United States
- Presiding Officer of the United States Senate
- United States Senate Vice Presidential Bust Collection
- List of vice presidents of the United States by previous experience

== Works cited ==
General

- "Chronological List of Presidents, First Ladies, and Vice Presidents of the United States". Library of Congress.
- "U.S. Senate: About the Vice President | Vice Presidents of the United States". United States Senate.

Expert studies

- Amar, Akhil Reed (1995). "Presidents, Vice Presidents, and Death: Closing the Constitution's Succession Gap". Arkansas Law Review. 48 (1): 215–238.
- Lynch, Michael; Madonna, Anthony; Owens, Mark; Williamson, Ryan D. (May 4, 2018). "The Vice President in the U.S. Senate: Examining the Consequences of Institutional Design". Congress & the Presidency. 45 (2): 145–165. doi:10.1080/07343469.2018.1444112. ISSN 0734-3469.
- Wolff, Wendy (1997). Vice Presidents of the United States, 1789-1993. U.S. Government Printing Office.
