= Vice presidency of John Adams =

U.S. vice presidential tenure from 1789 to 1797

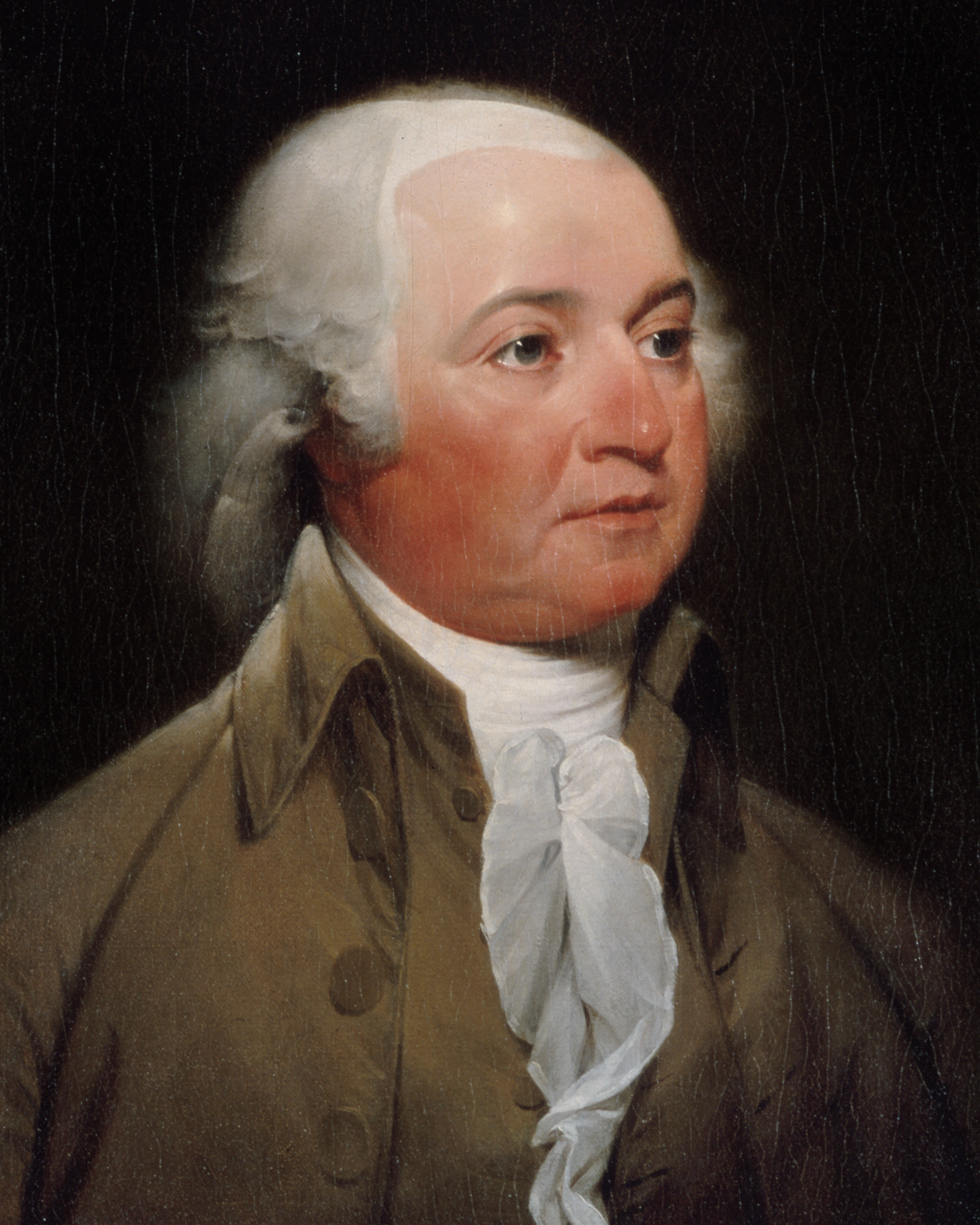
- Portrait of John Adams by John Trumbull, c. 1793
- Vice presidency of John Adams; April 21, 1789 (Note: Due to logistical delays, John Adams assumed the vice presidency 1 month and 17 days after the March 4, 1789, scheduled start of operations of the new government under the Constitution. As a result, his first term was only 1,413 days long, and was the shortest term for a U.S. vice president who served a full term.) – March 4, 1797
- President: George Washington
- Cabinet: See list
- Party: Pro-Administration (Note: Pro-Administration is a contemporary term for the supporters of the political and economic policies of the Washington administration prior to the formation of the Federalist and Democratic–Republican parties.) (before 1795); Federalist (after 1795)
- Election: 1788–89; 1792
- Seal of the Vice President

John Adams served as the first vice president of the United States from April 21, 1789 to March 4, 1797, during the presidency of George Washington. (Note: Due to logistical delays, John Adams assumed the vice presidency 1 month and 17 days after the March 4, 1789, scheduled start of operations of the new government under the Constitution. As a result, his first term was only 1,413 days long, and was the shortest term for a U.S. vice president who served a full term.) Vice President Adams was later elected president from 1797 to 1801, and his political rival Thomas Jefferson succeeded him as vice president and later as president. The only Federalist to hold the vice presidency, Adams was a leader of the American Revolution who served the United States government as a senior diplomat in Europe during the American Revolutionary War. Adams was succeeded in both offices by his political rival Thomas Jefferson.

Adams was elected to two terms as vice president under President George Washington. Although Adams was President of the Senate, his manner irritated Senators, creating the precedent of it being a largely ceremonial position. Adams cast 29 tie-breaking votes as President of the Senate in favor of Washington's policies, the third highest in history. Washington and Adams were reelected in the 1792 United States presidential election. Adams bemoaned the vice presidency's lack of influence, writing in 1793, "My country has in its wisdom contrived for me the most insignificant office that ever the invention of man contrived or his imagination conceived; and as I can do neither good nor evil, I must be borne away by others and meet the common fate."

Adams was elected as the United States' second president in 1796 under the banner of the Federalist Party. Jefferson came in second, which made him Adams' vice president under the electoral laws of the time. Four years later, in the 1800 presidential election, Jefferson again challenged Adams and won the presidency, becoming the second vice president to also become president.

== Creation of the vice presidency ==
No mention of an office of vice president was made at the 1787 Constitutional Convention until near the end, when an eleven-member committee on "Leftover Business" proposed a method of electing the chief executive (president). Delegates had previously considered the selection of the Senate's presiding officer, deciding that "the Senate shall choose its own President", and had agreed that this official would be designated the executive's immediate successor. They had also considered the mode of election of the executive but had not reached consensus. This all changed on September 4, when the committee recommended that the nation's chief executive be elected by an Electoral College, with each state having a number of presidential electors equal to the sum of that state's allocation of representatives and senators.

Recognizing that loyalty to one's individual state outweighed loyalty to the new federation, the Constitution's framers assumed individual electors would be inclined to choose a candidate from their own state (a so-called "favorite son" candidate) over one from another state. So they created the office of vice president and required the electors to vote for two candidates, at least one of whom must be from outside the elector's state, believing that the second vote would be cast for a candidate of national character. Additionally, to guard against the possibility that electors might strategically waste their second votes, it was specified that the first runner-up would become vice president.

The resultant method of electing the president and vice president, spelled out in Article II, Section 1, Clause 3, allocated to each state a number of electors equal to the combined total of its Senate and House of Representatives membership. Each elector was allowed to vote for two people for president (rather than for both president and vice president), but could not differentiate between their first and second choice for the presidency. The person receiving the greatest number of votes (provided it was an absolute majority of the whole number of electors) would be president, while the individual who received the next largest number of votes became vice president. If there were a tie for first or for second place, or if no one won a majority of votes, the president and vice president would be selected by means of contingent elections protocols stated in the clause.

Although delegates to the constitutional convention approved establishing the office, with both its executive and senatorial functions, not many understood the office, and so they gave the vice president few duties and little power. Only a few states had an analogous position. Among those that did, New York's constitution provided that "the lieutenant-governor shall, by virtue of his office, be president of the Senate, and, upon an equal division, have a casting voice in their decisions, but not vote on any other occasion". As a result, the vice presidency originally had authority in only a few areas, although constitutional amendments have added or clarified some matters.

=== President of the Senate ===
Article I, Section 3, Clause 4 confers upon the vice president the title "President of the Senate", authorizing the vice president to preside over Senate meetings. In this capacity, the vice president is responsible for maintaining order and decorum, recognizing members to speak, and interpreting the Senate's rules, practices, and precedent. With this position also comes the authority to cast a tie-breaking vote.

Adams presided regularly over Senate proceedings and did much to shape the role of Senate president.

== 1788-1789 Election ==
On June 17, 1788, Adams returned to a triumphant welcome in Massachusetts. He returned to farming life in the months after. The nation's first presidential election was soon to take place. Because George Washington was widely expected to win the presidency, many felt that the vice presidency should go to a northerner. Although he made no public comments on the matter, Adams was the primary contender. Each state's presidential electors gathered on February 4, 1789, to cast their two votes for the president. The person with the most votes would be president and the second would become vice president. Adams received 34 electoral college votes in the election, second behind Washington, who was a unanimous choice with 69 votes. As a result, Washington became the nation's first president, and Adams became its first vice president. Adams finished well ahead of all others except Washington, but was still offended by Washington receiving more than twice as many votes. In an effort to ensure that Adams did not accidentally become president and that Washington would have an overwhelming victory, Alexander Hamilton convinced at least 7 of the 69 electors not to cast their vote for Adams. After finding out about the manipulation but not Hamilton's role in it, Adams wrote to Benjamin Rush that his election was "a curse rather than a blessing."

Although his term started on March 4, 1789, Adams did not begin serving as vice president until April 21, because he did not arrive in New York in time.

== First term (1789–1793) ==
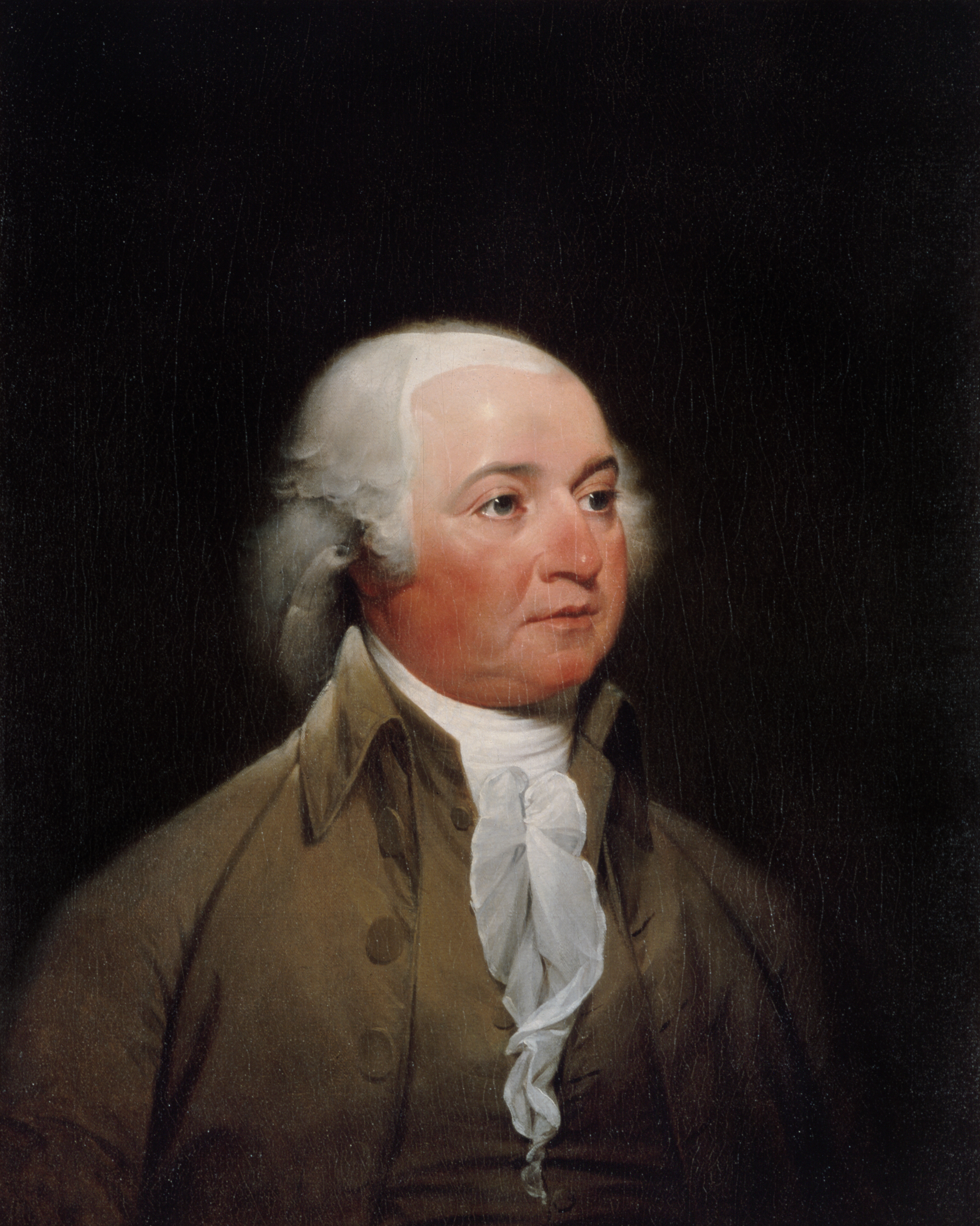
A 1793 portrait of Adams by John Trumbull

The sole constitutionally prescribed responsibility of the vice president is to preside over the U.S. Senate, where they were empowered to cast a tie-breaking vote. Early in his term, Adams became deeply involved in a lengthy Senate controversy over the official titles for the president and executive officers of the new government. Although the House agreed that the president should be addressed simply as "George Washington, President of the United States", the Senate debated the issue at some length. Adams favored the style of Highness (as well as the title of Protector of Their [the United States'] Liberties) for the president. Some senators favored a variant of Highness or the lesser Excellency. Anti-federalists in the Senate objected to the monarchical sound of them all; Jefferson described them as "superlatively ridiculous." They argued that these "distinctions," as Adams called them, violated the Constitution's prohibition on titles of nobility. Adams said that the distinctions were necessary because the highest office of the United States must be marked with "dignity and splendor". He was widely derided for his combative nature and stubbornness, especially as he actively debated and lectured the senators. "For forty minutes he harangued us from the chair," wrote Senator William Maclay of Pennsylvania. Maclay became Adams's fiercest opponent and repeatedly expressed personal contempt for him in public and private. He likened Adams to "a monkey just put into breeches." Ralph Izard suggested that Adams be referred to as "His Rotundity," a joke which soon became popular. On May 14, 1789, the Senate decided that the title of "Mr. President" would be used. Privately, Adams conceded that his vice presidency had begun poorly and that perhaps he had been out of the country too long to know the sentiment of the people. Washington quietly expressed his displeasure with the fuss.

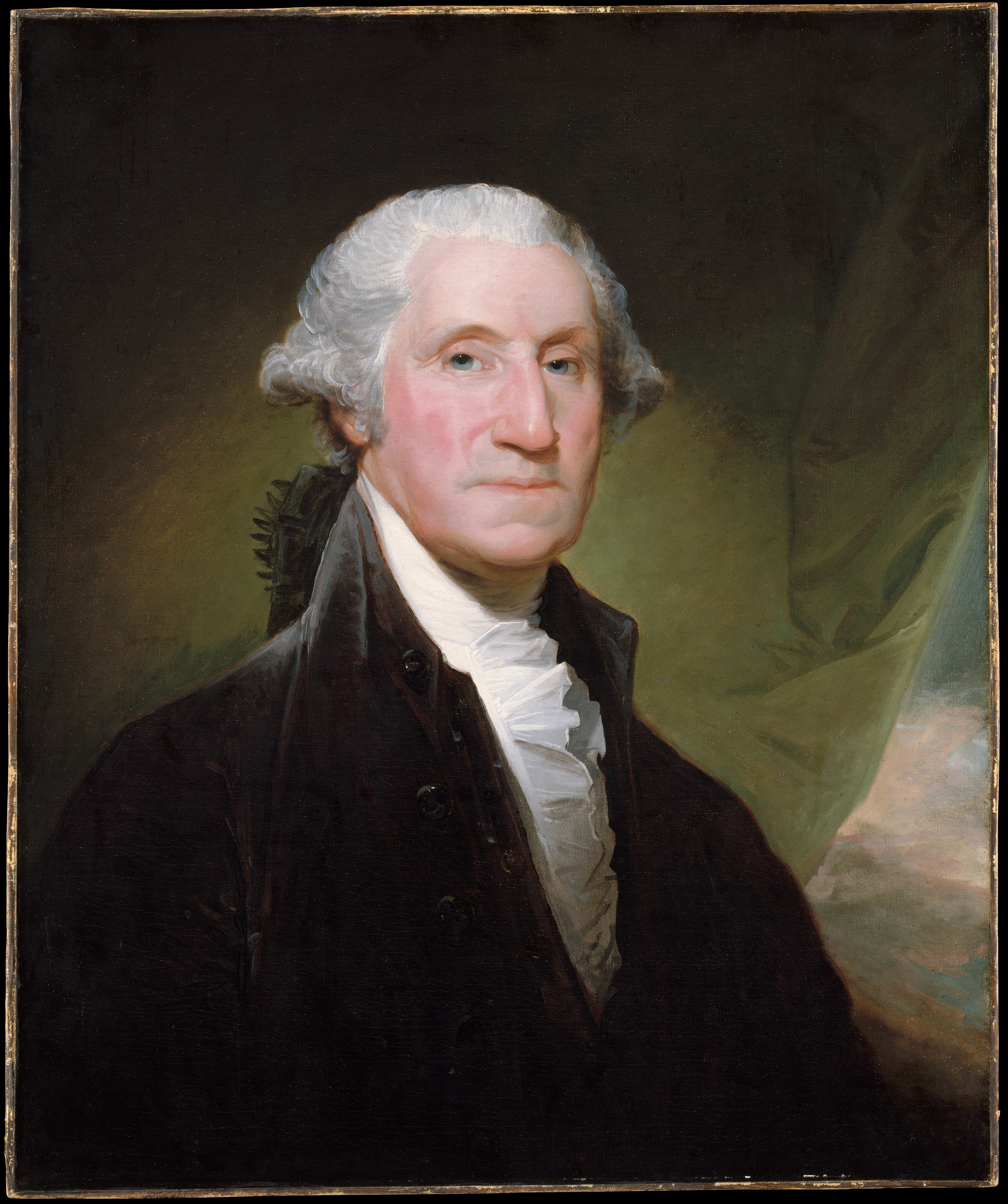
Portrait of George Washington by Gilbert Stuart, 1795. Washington rarely consulted Vice President Adams, who often felt marginalized and overshadowed by Washington's prestige.

As vice president, Adams largely sided with the Washington administration and the emerging Federalist Party. He supported Washington's policies against opposition from anti-Federalist Republicans. He cast 29 tie-breaking votes, and is one of only three vice presidents who have cast more than 20 during their tenure. He voted against a bill sponsored by Maclay that would have required Senate consent for the removal of executive branch officials who had been confirmed by the Senate. In 1790, Jefferson, James Madison, and Hamilton struck a bargain guaranteeing Republican support for Hamilton's debt assumption plan in exchange for the capital being temporarily moved from New York to Philadelphia, and then to a permanent site on the Potomac River to placate Southerners. In the Senate, Adams cast a tie-breaking vote against a last-minute motion to keep the capital in New York.

Adams played a minor role in politics as vice president. He attended few cabinet meetings, and the President sought his counsel infrequently. While Adams brought energy and dedication to the office, by mid-1789 he had already found it "not quite adapted to my character ... too inactive, and mechanical." Adams's initial behavior in the Senate made him a target for critics of the Washington administration. Toward the end of his first term, he grew accustomed to a marginal role, and rarely intervened in debate. Adams never questioned Washington's courage or patriotism, but Washington did join Franklin and others as the object of Adams's ire or envy. "The History of our Revolution will be one continued lie," Adams declared. "The essence of the whole will be that Dr. Franklin's electrical Rod smote the Earth and out sprung General Washington. That Franklin electrified him with his Rod – and henceforth these two conducted all the Policy, Negotiations, Legislatures and War." Adams won reelection with little difficulty in 1792 with 77 votes. His strongest challenger, George Clinton, had 50.

On July 14, 1789, the French Revolution began. Republicans were jubilant. Adams at first expressed cautious optimism, but soon began denouncing the revolutionaries as barbarous and tyrannical.

Adam's first term was the shortest of any complete vice presidential term due to the delay in Adams assuming office.

== Second term (1793-1797) ==
After the reelection of Washington and Adams in 1792, Adams' second term began on March 4, 1793. John Adams had become embittered by the vice presidency, writing to Abigail on December 19, "My country has in its wisdom contrived for me the most insignificant office that ever the invention of man contrived or his imagination conceived; and as I can do neither good nor evil, I must be borne away by others and meet the common fate."

Washington eventually consulted Adams more often in his second term, but not until near the end of his administration, by which point distinguished cabinet members Hamilton and Jefferson had resigned. The British had been raiding American trading vessels, and John Jay was sent to London to negotiate an end to hostilities. When he returned in 1795 with a peace treaty on terms unfavorable to the United States, Adams urged Washington to sign it to prevent war. Washington did so, igniting protests and riots. He was accused of surrendering American honor to a tyrannical monarchy and of turning his back on the French Republic. John Adams predicted in a letter to Abigail that ratification would deeply divide the nation.

== List of tie-breaking votes cast in the Senate ==
Date	Action	Vote	Ultimate result
July 18, 1789	To strike out of the bill("An act for establishing an Executive Department, to be denominated the Department of Foreign Affairs.") these words: page 3d, line 15th, 'by the President of the United States'.	Nay: 9-10	Motion defeated.
August 25, 1789	To recede from disagreement to a House amendment to the bill (1 STAT 65, APP. 9-2-1789), to establish a treasury dept.; said amendment provides that in the absence of a Secretary of the Treasury, the assistant shall have charge of the office.	Yea: 11-10	Motion agreed to.
September 21, 1789	To amend the act (1 STAT 101, APP. 3-1-90), to allow compensation to the judges of the Supreme Court and other courts, and to the attorney general; to increase the salary of the Chief Justice from $3500 to $4000.	Yea: 10-9	Amendment passed.
September 24, 1789	To Amend H.R. 25, to insert, as possible sites, certain counties in the state of Pennsylvania, including Germantown and Philadelphia	Yea: 10-9	Amendment passed.
May 26, 1790	To decide if the sum of two thousand dollars will remain in the act (6 STAT 2, APP. 6-4-90), to adjust the claim of Baron De Steuben.	Yea: 13-12	Motion passed.
May 26, 1790	To amend the Steuben bill to eliminate the provision for a sum of seven thousand dollars, in addition to the money already received by him.	Nay: 12-13	Amendment failed.
May 27, 1790	To amend the Steuben bill to change to the sum to be paid to Steuben from two thousand dollars to two thousand five hundred dollars.	Yea: 13-12	Amendment passed.

== Election of 1796 ==
1796 presidential election results in which Adams narrowly defeated Thomas Jefferson

The 1796 election was the first contested American presidential election. Twice, George Washington had been elected to office unanimously but, during his presidency, deep philosophical differences between the two leading figures in the administration – Hamilton and Jefferson – had caused a rift, leading to the founding of the Federalist and Republican parties. When Washington announced that he would not stand for a third term, an intense partisan struggle for control of Congress and the presidency began.

As in the previous two presidential elections, no candidates were put forward for voters to choose between in 1796. The Constitution provided for the selection of electors who would then choose a president. In seven states voters chose the presidential electors. In the remaining nine states, they were chosen by the state's legislature. The clear Republican favorite was Jefferson. Adams was the Federalist frontrunner. The Republicans held a congressional nominating caucus and named Jefferson and Aaron Burr as their presidential choices. Jefferson at first declined the nomination, but he agreed to run a few weeks later. Federalist members of Congress held an informal nominating caucus and named Adams and Thomas Pinckney as their candidates. The campaign was mostly confined to newspaper attacks, pamphlets, and political rallies; of the four contenders, only Burr actively campaigned. The practice of not campaigning for office would persist for decades. Adams stated that he wanted to stay out of the "silly and wicked game" of electioneering.

As the campaign progressed, fears grew among Hamilton and his supporters that Adams was too vain, opinionated, unpredictable and stubborn to follow their directions. Indeed, Adams did not consider himself a strong member of the Federalist Party. He had remarked that Hamilton's economic program, centered around banks, would "swindle" the poor and unleash the "gangrene of avarice." Desiring "a more pliant president than Adams," Hamilton maneuvered to tip the election to Pinckney. He coerced South Carolina Federalist electors, pledged to vote for "favorite son" Pinckney, to scatter their second votes among candidates other than Adams. Hamilton's scheme was undone when several New England state electors heard of it and agreed not to vote for Pinckney. Adams wrote shortly after the election that Hamilton was a "proud Spirited, conceited, aspiring Mortal always pretending to Morality, with as debauched Morals as old Franklin who is more his Model than any one I know." Throughout his life, Adams made highly critical statements about Hamilton. He made derogatory references to his womanizing, real or alleged, and slurred him as the "Creole bastard."

Adams won the presidency by a narrow margin, receiving 71 electoral votes to 68 for Jefferson, who became the vice president; Pinckney finished third with 59 votes, and Burr came fourth with 30. The balance of the votes were dispersed among nine other candidates. This is the only election to date in which a president and vice president were elected from opposing tickets.

== Legacy ==
=== Historical reputation ===
Benjamin Franklin summarized what many thought of Adams, saying "He means well for his country, is always an honest man, often a wise one, but sometimes, and in some things, absolutely out of his senses." Adams strongly felt that he would be forgotten and underappreciated by history. These feelings often manifested themselves through envy and verbal attacks on other Founders. Edmund Morgan argues, "Adams was ridiculously vain, absurdly jealous, embarrassingly hungry for compliments. But no man ever served his country more selflessly."

Historian George C. Herring argued that Adams was the most independent minded of the Founders. Though he formally aligned with the Federalists, he was somewhat a party unto himself, at times disagreeing with the Federalists as much as he did the Republicans. He was often described as prickly, but his tenacity was fed by decisions made in the face of universal opposition. Adams was often combative, as he admitted: "[As President] I refused to suffer in silence. I sighed, sobbed, and groaned, and sometimes screeched and screamed. And I must confess to my shame and sorrow that I sometimes swore." Stubbornness was seen as one of his defining traits, a fact for which Adams made no apology. "Thanks to God that he gave me stubbornness when I know I am right," he wrote. His resolve to advance peace with France while maintaining a posture of defense reduced his popularity and contributed to his defeat for reelection. Most historians applaud him for avoiding an all-out war with France during his presidency. His signing of the Alien and Sedition Acts is almost always condemned.

According to Ferling, Adams's political philosophy fell "out of step" with national trends. The country tended further away from Adams's emphasis on order and the rule of law and towards the Jeffersonian vision of liberty and weak central government. In the years following his retirement, as first Jeffersonianism and then Jacksonian democracy grew to dominate American politics, Adams was largely forgotten. In the 1840 presidential election, Whig candidate William Henry Harrison was attacked by Democrats on the false allegation that he had been a supporter of John Adams. Adams was eventually subject to criticism from states' rights advocates. Edward A. Pollard, a strong supporter of the Confederacy during the American Civil War, singled out Adams, writing:

The first President from the North, John Adams, asserted and essayed to put into practice the supremacy of the "National" power over the states and the citizens thereof. He was sustained in his attempted usurpations by all the New England states and by a powerful public sentiment in each of the Middle States. The "strict constructionists" of the Constitution were not slow in raising the standard of opposition against a pernicious error.

In the 21st century, Adams remains less well known than many of the Founders, in accordance with his predictions. McCullough argued that "[t]he problem with Adams is that most Americans know nothing about him." Todd Leopold of CNN wrote in 2001 that Adams is "remembered as that guy who served a single term as president between Washington and Jefferson." He has always been seen, Ferling says, as "honest and dedicated", but despite his lengthy career in public service, is still overshadowed. Gilbert Chinard, in his 1933 biography of Adams, described him as "staunch, honest, stubborn and somewhat narrow." In his 1962 biography, Page Smith lauds Adams for his fight against radicals whose promised reforms portended anarchy and misery. Ferling, in his 1992 biography, writes that "Adams was his own worst enemy." He criticizes him for his "pettiness ... jealousy, and vanity", and faults his frequent separations from his family. He praises Adams for his willingness to acknowledge his deficiencies and for striving to overcome them.

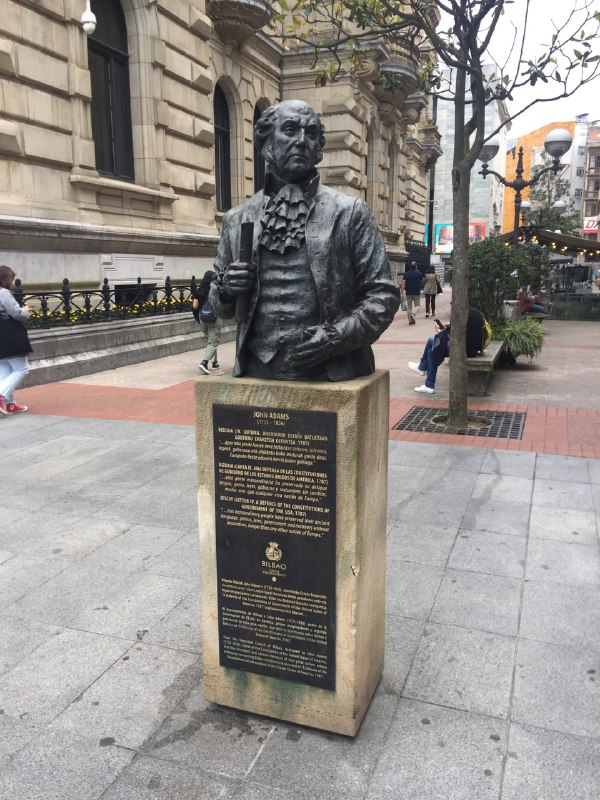
John Adams statue in Bilbao

In 2001, McCullough published the biography John Adams, in which he lauds Adams for consistency and honesty, "plays down or explains away" his more controversial actions, and criticizes Jefferson. The book sold very well and was very favorably received and, along with the Ferling biography, contributed to a rapid resurgence in Adams's reputation. In 2008, a miniseries was released based on the McCullough biography, featuring Paul Giamatti as Adams.

=== In memoriam ===
Adams is commemorated as the namesake of various counties, buildings, and other items. One example is the John Adams Building of the Library of Congress, an institution whose existence Adams had signed into law.

Adams is honored on the Memorial to the 56 Signers of the Declaration of Independence in Washington D.C. He does not have an individual monument dedicated to him in the city, although a family Adams Memorial was authorized in 2001. According to McCullough, "Popular symbolism has not been very generous toward Adams. There is no memorial, no statue ... in his honor in our nation's capital, and to me that is absolutely inexcusable. It's long past time when we should recognize what he did, and who he was."

== See also ==
- Presidency of John Adams
- Electoral history of John Adams
- Founders Online
- List of abolitionist forerunners
- List of presidents of the United States

== Bibliography ==
=== Biographies ===
- Chinard, Gilbert (1933). Honest John Adams. Boston: Little, Brown, and Co. OCLC 988108386.
- Diggins, John P. (2003). Schlesinger, Arthur M. Jr. (ed.). John Adams. The American Presidents. New York: Time Books. ISBN 978-0-8050-6937-2.
- Ellis, Joseph J. (1993). Passionate Sage: The Character and Legacy of John Adams. New Yorkpublisher=W.W. Norton & Co. ISBN 978-0-393-31133-4.
- Ferling, John E. (1992). John Adams: A Life. Knoxville: University of Tennessee Press. ISBN 978-0-87049-730-8.
- McCullough, David (2001). John Adams. New York: Simon & Schuster. ISBN 978-1-4165-7588-7.
- Morse, John Torey (1884). John Adams. Boston: Houghton, Mifflin, and Company. OCLC 926779205.
- Smith, Page (1962a). John Adams. Vol. I, 1735–1784. New Yorkpublisher=Doubleday & Co. ISBN 9780837123486. OCLC 852986601.
- Smith, Page (1962b). John Adams. Vol. II, 1784–1826. New York: Doubleday & Co. ISBN 978-0-8371-2348-6. OCLC 852986620.

=== Specialized studies ===
- Boyd, Julian Parks; Gawalt, Gerard W. (1999). The Declaration of Independence: the evolution of the text. Library of Congress in association with the Thomas Jefferson Memorial Foundation. ISBN 978-0-8444-0980-1.
- Brookhiser, Richard (2002). America's First Dynasty: The Adamses, 1735–1918. New York: Simon & Schuster. ISBN 978-0-7432-4209-7.
- Burns, James MacGregor (2013). Fire and Light: How the Enlightenment Transformed Our World. New York: St. Martin's Press. ISBN 978-1-250-02490-9.
- Chernow, Ron (2004). Alexander Hamilton. London: Penguin Books. ISBN 978-1-101-20085-8.
- Elkins, Stanley M.; McKitrick, Eric (1993). The Age of Federalism. Oxford, NY: Oxford University Press. ISBN 978-0-19-506890-0.
- Ellis, Joseph J. (2003). Founding Brothers: The Revolutionary Generation. New York: Knopf Doubleday Publishing Group. ISBN 978-1-4000-7768-7.
- Everett, Robert B. (1966). "The Mature Religious Thought of John Adams" (PDF). Proceedings of the South Carolina Historical Association. ISSN 0361-6207.
- Fea, John. "John Adams and religion." in A Companion to John Adams and John Quincy Adams (2013) pp. 184–198 online.
- Ferling, John (2009). The Ascent of George Washington: The Hidden Political Genius of an American Icon. New York: Bloomsbury Press. ISBN 978-1-59691-465-0.
- Fielding, Howard (1940). "John Adams: Puritan, Deist, Humanist". Journal of Religion. 20 (1): 33–46. doi:10.1086/482479. ISSN 0022-4189. JSTOR 1198647. S2CID 170183234.
- Flexner, James Thomas (1974). Washington: The Indispensable Man. Boston: Little, Brown. ISBN 978-0-316-28605-3.
- Georgini, Sara. Household Gods: The Religious Lives of the Adams Family (Oxford University Press, 2019) excerpt
- Gimbel, Richard (1956). A Bibliographical Check List of Common Sense, With an Account of Its Publication. New Haven, CT: Yale University Press.
- Herring, George C. (2008). From colony to superpower: U.S. foreign relations since 1776. Oxford, NY: Oxford University Press. ISBN 978-0-19-974377-3.
- Hoadley, John F. (1986). Origins of American Political Parties: 1789–1803. Lexington: University Press of Kentucky. ISBN 978-0-8131-5320-9.
- Holdzkom, Marianne. Remembering John Adams: The Second President in History, Memory and Popular Culture (McFarland, 2023) online.
- Holmes, David L. The Faiths of the Founding Fathers (Oxford University Press, 2006) ch 7, "The Religious Views of John Adams," pp 73–108; also pp 117–121 on Abigail Adams.
- Holton, Woody (2010). Abigail Adams: A Life. New York: Atria. ISBN 9781451607369.
- Hutson, James H. (1968). "John Adams' Title Campaign (March 1968)". The New England Quarterly. 41 (1): 30–39. doi:10.2307/363331. JSTOR 363331.
- Kirtley, James Samuel (1910). Half Hour Talks on Character Building: By Self-made Men and Women. A. Hamming. OCLC 13927429.
- Kurtz, Stephen G. (1957). The Presidency of John Adams: The Collapse of Federalism, 1795–1800. Philadelphia: University of Pennsylvania Press. ISBN 978-0-8122-7101-0. OCLC 979781538.
- Maier, Pauline (1998). American Scripture: Making the Declaration of Independence. New York: Vintage Books. ISBN 978-0-679-77908-7.
- Mayville, Luke (2016). John Adams and the Fear of American Oligarchy. Princeton: Princeton University Press. ISBN 978-1-4008-8369-1.
- McDonald, Forrest (1974). The Presidency of George Washington. American Presidency. Lawrence: University Press of Kansas. ISBN 978-0-7006-0359-6.
- Miller, Nathan (1997). The U.S. Navy: A History (3rd ed.). Annapolis, MD: Naval Institute Press. ISBN 978-1-61251-892-3.
- Moore, George (1866). Notes on the history of slavery in Massachusetts. New York: D. Appleton & Co. ISBN 978-0-608-41018-0. OCLC 419266287.
- Perry, James R. (1986). "Supreme Court Appointments, 1789–1801: Criteria, Presidential Style, and the Press of Events". Journal of the Early Republic. 6 (4): 371–410. doi:10.2307/3122645. JSTOR 3122645.
- Pollard, Edward A. (1862). The First Year of the War. Richmond, VA: West & Johnson. OCLC 79953002.
- Rossiter, Clinton (1955). Conservatism in America. New York: Knopf. OCLC 440025153.
- Scherr, Arthur (2018). John Adams, Slavery, and Race: Ideas, Politics, and Diplomacy in an Age of Crisis. Santa Barbara, CA: Praeger.
- Shafer, Ronald G. (2016). Carnival Campaign: How the Rollicking 1840 Campaign of "Tippecanoe and Tyler Too" Changed Presidential Politics Forever. Chicago: Review Press. ISBN 978-1-61373-543-5.
- Thompson, C. Bradley (1998). John Adams and the Spirit of Liberty. Lawrence: University Press of Kansas. ISBN 978-0-7006-0915-4.
- Wiencek, Henry (2004). An Imperfect God: George Washington, His Slaves, and the Creation of America. Waterville, ME: Thorndike Press. p. 215. ISBN 978-0-7862-6129-1.
- Wood, Gordon S. (2006). Revolutionary Characters: What Made the Founders Different. London: Penguin Books. ISBN 978-1-59420-093-9.
- Wood, Gordon S. (2009). Empire of Liberty: A history of the Early Republic, 1789–1815. Oxford: Oxford University Press. ISBN 978-0-19-974109-0.
- Wood, Gordon S. (2017). Friends Divided: John Adams and Thomas Jefferson. New York: Penguin. ISBN 978-0-7352-2473-5.

=== Primary sources ===
- Adams, John; Adams, Charles Francis (1851). The Works of John Adams, Second President of the United States: Autobiography, continued. Diary. Essays and controversial papers of the Revolution. Vol. 3. Little, Brown.
- Adams, John (1892). Biddle, Alexander (ed.). Old Family Letters. Philadelphia, PA: Press of J.B. Lippincott Co. p. 38.
- Adams, John (2001). Carey, George Wescott (ed.). The Political Writings of John Adams. Washington, D.C.: Gateway Editions.
- Adams, John (2004). Diggins, John Patrick (ed.). The Portable John Adams. London: Penguin Books. ISBN 978-0-14-243778-0.
- Adams, John (1954). Peek, George A. Jr. (ed.). The Political Writings of John Adams: Representative Selections. New York: Liberal Arts Press. ISBN 978-0-87220-699-1. OCLC 52727656.
- Adams, John; Rush, Benjamin (1966). Schutz, John A.; Adair, Douglass (eds.). Spur of Fame, The Dialogues of John Adams and Benjamin Rush, 1805–1813. Santa Marino, CA: Huntington Library. ISBN 978-0-86597-287-2.
- Adams, John; Tudor, William (1819). Novanglus, and Massachusettensis: Or, Political Essays, Published in the Years 1774 and 1775, on the Principal Points of Controversy, Between Great Britain and Her Colonies. Princeton, NJ: Hews & Gloss. OCLC 33610833.
- Adams, John (1965). Wroth, L. Kinvin; Zobel, Hiller B. (eds.). The Legal Papers of John Adams. Cambridge, MA: Harvard University Press. ISBN 978-0-674-52250-3.
- Butterfield, L. H., et al., eds., The Adams Papers (1961– ). Multivolume letterpress edition of all letters to and from major members of the Adams family, plus their diaries; still incomplete. "The Adams Family Papers Editorial Project". Masshist.org.
- Butterfield, L. H., ed. Adams Family Correspondence. Cambridge: Harvard University Press
- Cappon, Lester J., ed. (1959). The Adams–Jefferson Letters: The Complete Correspondence Between Thomas Jefferson and Abigail and John Adams. Chapel Hill: The University of North Carolina Press. ISBN 978-0-8078-4230-0.
- Foot, Michael; Kramnick, Isaac, eds. (1987). The Thomas Paine Reader. Penguin Classics. ISBN 978-0-14-044496-4.
- Hogan, Margaret; Taylor, C. James, eds. (2007). My Dearest Friend: Letters of Abigail and John Adams. Cambridge: Harvard University Press.
- Richardson, James Daniel, ed. (1897). A Compilation of the Messages and Papers of the Presidents. Vol. 1. Cambridge, MA: Harvard University. OCLC 3144460227.
- Taylor, Robert J. et al., eds. Papers of John Adams. Cambridge, MA: Harvard University Press.
