= Vice presidency of George Clinton =

U.S. vice presidential tenure from 1805 to 1812

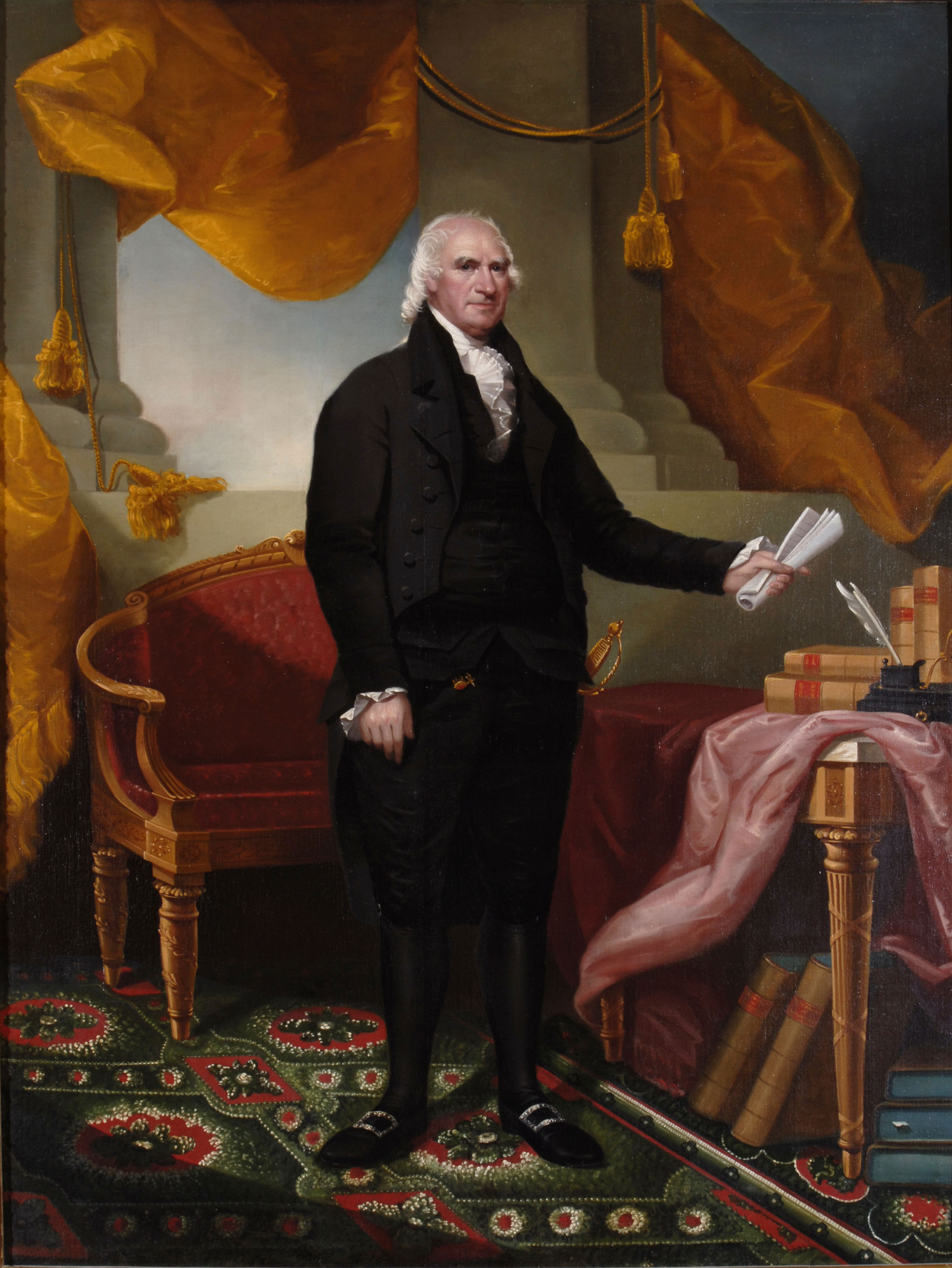
- Portrait, c. 1802
- Vice presidency of George Clinton; March 4, 1805 – April 20, 1812 (Note: Clinton was the first vice president to die in office.)
- President: Thomas Jefferson; James Madison
- Cabinet: Jefferson; Madison
- Party: Democratic-Republican Party (Note: Most commonly referred to as the Republican Party at the time)
- Election: 1804, 1808
- Seal of the Vice President

The vice presidency of George Clinton lasted from 1805 until his death in 1812. George Clinton served as the fourth vice president in the second term of the Thomas Jefferson's presidency and the first term of the James Madison's presidency. Clinton was the first vice-president to die in office, and the first of two to hold office under two consecutive presidents. (Note: John C. Calhoun, who served under John Quincy Adams and Andrew Jackson, is the only other vice president to hold office under two consecutive presidents. Both became the political opponent of the second president they served under.) Clinton is the only person in the history of the United States to win electoral votes in six different electoral college contests, and was a candidate for vice president five times.

Clinton's tenure as governor was the second-longest in U.S. history, from 1777–1795 and 1801–1804. (Note: Governor of Iowa Terry Branstad surpassed Clinton's record in 2015.) In the early 1790s, Clinton emerged as a leader of the incipient Democratic-Republican Party, serving as the party's vice presidential candidate in the 1792 presidential election. Clinton received the third most electoral votes in the election, as President George Washington and Vice President John Adams both won re-election. Some Democratic-Republican party leaders attempted to recruit Clinton to run for vice president in 1796 election, but he refused to run and party leaders instead turned to another New Yorker, Aaron Burr. Clinton nonetheless received seven electoral votes.

Clinton was elected vice president after being tapped again as President Jefferson's vice presidential nominee in the 1804 election, as Jefferson dumped Burr from the ticket. Clinton sought his party's presidential nomination in the 1808 election, but the party's congressional nominating caucus renominated him for vice president, instead nominating Madison for the presidency. Despite his opposition to Madison, Clinton was re-elected as vice president. Unusually, Clinton openly fought against Madison in his second term as vice president. Clinton died in 1812, leaving the office of vice president vacant for the first time in U.S. history. Just two years later, Clinton's successor Elbridge Gerry would become the second vice president in a row to die in office.

== 1788–1789 vice presidential election ==
In the first U.S. presidential election, held from 1788 to 1789, many Anti-Federalists supported Clinton for the position of vice president. Federalists rallied around the candidacy of John Adams, and Adams finished second in the electoral vote behind George Washington, making Adams vice president. Clinton received just three electoral votes, partly because the New York legislature deadlocked and was unable to appoint a slate of electors.

During this time there was ambiguity over the vice presidency, which contained no definite job description beyond being the president's designated successor and presiding over the Senate. The presidency was designed with Washington in mind, but there was no model for the vice presidency. The Constitution stipulated that the position would be awarded to the runner-up in the presidential election. Because Washington was from Virginia, then the largest state, many assumed that electors would choose a vice president from a northern state. In an August 1788 letter, U.S. Minister to France Thomas Jefferson wrote that he considered John Adams and John Hancock, both from Massachusetts, to be the top contenders. Jefferson suggested John Jay, John Rutledge, and Virginian James Madison as other possible candidates. Adams received 34 electoral votes, one short of a majority – because the Constitution did not require an outright majority in the Electoral College prior to ratification of the Twelfth Amendment to elect a runner-up as vice president, Adams was elected to that post.

The outgoing Congress of the Confederation announced the procedure for the election on September 13, 1788, stipulating that all electors must be chosen on the first Wednesday in January (January 7, 1789), and that the electors must assemble to cast their votes for president and vice president on the first Wednesday in February (February 4). However, the states differed in their interpretations of this procedure and of the relevant portions of the new Constitution. New Hampshire and Massachusetts held a popular vote for their presidential electors alongside the elections for their representatives in the new Congress, on December 15 and December 18, respectively. In these two states, the legislatures ultimately chose the electors based on the voting results on the appointed day, January 7. In Delaware, Maryland, Pennsylvania, and Virginia, the electors were chosen directly by the popular vote on January 7. In Connecticut, Georgia, and South Carolina, the electors were appointed by the legislature alone on January 7, while in New Jersey the governor and council selected them on that day. The legislature in New York was unable to agree on a method for choosing the electors before January 7, and so the state could not appoint any electors.

Voter turnout comprised a low single-digit percentage of the adult population. Though all states allowed some rudimentary form of popular vote, only six ratifying states allowed any form of popular vote specifically for presidential electors. In most states only white men, and in many only those who owned property, could vote. Free black men could vote in four Northern states, and women could vote in New Jersey until 1804. In some states, there was a nominal religious test for voting. For example, in Massachusetts and Connecticut, the Congregational Church was established, supported by taxes. Voting was hampered by poor communications and infrastructure and the labor demands imposed by farming. Two months passed after the election before the votes were counted and Washington was notified that he had been elected president. Washington spent eight days traveling from Virginia to New York for the inauguration. Congress took twenty-eight days to assemble.

As the electors were selected, politics intruded, and the process was not free of rumors and intrigue. For example, Hamilton aimed to ensure that Adams did not inadvertently tie Washington in the electoral vote. Also, Federalists spread rumors that Anti-Federalists plotted to elect Richard Henry Lee or Patrick Henry president, with George Clinton as vice president. Due to the deadlock in New York, Clinton received only three electoral votes.

== 1792 vice presidential election ==
In the 1792 presidential election, Governor Clinton was chosen by the nascent Democratic-Republican Party as their candidate for vice president. Born out of the Anti-Federalist faction that had opposed the Constitution in 1788, the Democratic-Republican Party was the main opposition to the agenda of Treasury Secretary Alexander Hamilton. They had no chance of unseating Washington, but hoped to win the vice presidency by defeating the incumbent, Adams. While the Republicans joined in the general acclamation of Washington for a second term as president, they objected to the allegedly "monarchical" attitude of Vice President Adams. Clinton was nominated rather than Thomas Jefferson because the Virginia electors could not vote for Washington, and for a second Virginian. Though Washington was essentially unopposed for presidential reelection, Adams faced a competitive re-election against Clinton. Because few doubted that Washington would receive the greatest number of votes, Adams and Clinton were effectively competing for the vice presidency; under the letter of the law, however, they were technically candidates for president competing against Washington.

Many Democratic-Republicans would have preferred to nominate Thomas Jefferson, their ideological leader and Washington's Secretary of State. However, this would have cost them the state of Virginia, as electors were not permitted to vote for two candidates from their home state and Washington was also a Virginian. Clinton, the Governor of New York and a former anti-Federalist leader, became the party's nominee after he won the backing of Jefferson and James Madison. Clinton was from an electorally important swing state, and he convinced party leaders that he would be a stronger candidate than another New Yorker, Senator Aaron Burr. A group of Democratic-Republican leaders met in Philadelphia in October 1792 and selected Clinton as the party's vice presidential candidate.

Clinton received 50 electoral votes to 77 for Adams. His candidacy was damaged by his anti-Federalist record and by his narrow and disputed re-election as governor in 1792. (He won by only 108 votes, and the substantial anti-Clinton vote of Otsego County was excluded on a technicality.)

== 1796 vice presidential election ==
Democratic-Republican party leaders attempted to recruit him to run for vice president in 1796 election, but Clinton refused to run and party leaders instead turned to another New Yorker, Aaron Burr. Clinton nonetheless received seven electoral votes. Clinton entered the 1801 gubernatorial race at Burr's urging, and defeated the Federalist Party nominee, Stephen Van Rensselaer. Clinton served as governor until 1804. With 21 years of service, he was the longest-serving governor of a U.S. state until December 14, 2015, when Iowa governor Terry Branstad surpassed him.

== 1800 election between Jefferson and Burr ==
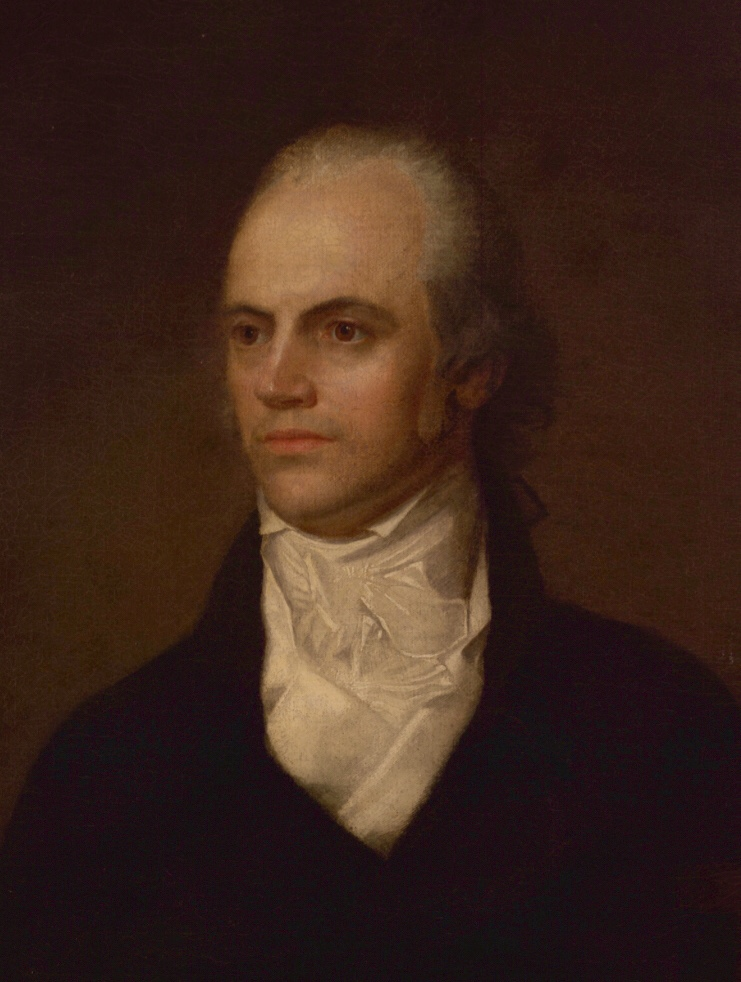
Burr as vice president under Thomas Jefferson in 1803

In the 1800 United States presidential election, Burr combined the political influence of the Manhattan Company with party campaign innovations to deliver New York's support for Thomas Jefferson. That year, New York's state legislature chose the presidential electors, as they had four years earlier, in 1796, when they gave their support to John Adams. Prior to the April 1800 legislative elections, the State Assembly was controlled by the Federalists. The City of New York elected assembly members on an at-large basis. Burr and Hamilton were the key campaigners for their respective parties. Burr's Democratic-Republican slate of assemblymen was elected, giving the party control of the legislature, which in turn gave New York State's electoral votes to Jefferson and Burr. This drove another wedge between Burr and Hamilton, who had developed a rivalry with Jefferson. Burr enlisted the help of Tammany Hall to win the voting for selection of Electoral College delegates.

Burr was chosen to be the junior member of the Democratic-Republican presidential ticket with Jefferson in the 1800 election, and carried his home state of New York. The Democratic-Republican Party planned to have 72 of their 73 electors vote for Jefferson and Burr, with the remaining elector voting only for Jefferson. The electors failed to execute this plan and Burr and Jefferson were tied with 73 votes each. The Constitution stipulated that if two candidates with an Electoral College majority were tied, the election would be moved to the House of Representatives—which was controlled by the Federalists, at this point, many of whom were loath to vote for Jefferson. Members of the Democratic-Republican Party understood they intended that Jefferson should be president and Burr vice president, but the tied vote required that the final choice be made by the U.S. House of Representatives, with each of the sixteen states having one vote, and nine votes needed for election.

Burr remained quiet publicly, refusing to surrender the presidency to Jefferson, who was seen as the great enemy of the Federalists. Rumors circulated that he and a faction of Federalists were encouraging Democratic-Republican representatives to vote for him, blocking Jefferson's election in the House. However, solid evidence of such a conspiracy was lacking, and historians generally gave Burr the benefit of the doubt. In 2011, however, historian Thomas Baker discovered a previously unknown letter from William P. Van Ness to Edward Livingston, two leading Democratic-Republicans in New York. Van Ness was very close to Burr, serving as his second in the duel with Alexander Hamilton. As a leading Democratic-Republican, Van Ness secretly supported the Federalist plan to elect Burr as president and tried to get Livingston to join. Livingston agreed at first, then reversed himself. Baker argues that Burr probably supported the Van Ness plan: "There is a compelling pattern of circumstantial evidence, much of it newly discovered, that strongly suggests Aaron Burr did exactly that as part of a stealth campaign to compass the presidency for himself." The attempt did not work, however, at least in part because of Livingston's reversal and especially Hamilton's vigorous opposition to Burr.

Although Hamilton had a long-standing rivalry with Jefferson stemming from their tenure as members of George Washington's cabinet, he regarded Burr as far more dangerous and used all his influence to ensure Jefferson's election. On the 36th ballot, the House of Representatives gave Jefferson the presidency, with Burr becoming vice president.

Jefferson never trusted Burr, so he was effectively shut out of party matters. As vice president, Burr earned praise from some enemies for his even-handedness and his judicial manner as President of the Senate; he fostered some practices for that office that have become time-honored traditions. Burr's judicial manner in presiding over the impeachment trial of Justice Samuel Chase has been credited as helping to preserve the principle of judicial independence that was established by Marbury v. Madison in 1803. One newspaper wrote that Burr had conducted the proceedings with the "impartiality of an angel, but with the rigor of a devil".

== 1804 vice presidential election ==
Since Burr had fallen out with Jefferson administration following the 1800 election, Jefferson often consulted with Clinton rather than Burr regarding New York appointments. When it became clear that Jefferson would drop Burr from his ticket in the 1804 election, Burr ran for governor of New York instead. He lost the gubernatorial election to little known Morgan Lewis, in what was the most significant margin of loss in the state's history up to that time. Burr blamed his loss on a personal smear campaign believed to have been orchestrated by his party rivals, including Clinton. Hamilton also opposed Burr, due to his belief that Burr had entertained a Federalist secession movement in New York.

Aaron Burr became the first vice president to be dropped from a presidential ticket. Clinton was selected as President Jefferson's running mate in the 1804 presidential election, replacing Burr. Clinton was selected due to his long public service and his popularity in the electorally important state of New York. He was also favored by Jefferson because, at age 69 in 1808, Jefferson hoped that Clinton would be too old to launch a presidential bid against Jefferson's preferred successor, Secretary of State James Madison.

== Jefferson's vice president ==
When the Democratic-Republican ticket won the 1804 election, Clinton became the fourth vice president of the United States, and would become the first vice president to serve under two presidents, Jefferson and Madison. During his first term as vice president, under Thomas Jefferson, Clinton found himself marginalized by the President, as Jefferson sought to avoid enhancing his vice president's stature―still cognizant that Clinton could challenge Madison in 1808. Not only was Clinton largely ignored by President Jefferson, he struggled in his position as President of the Senate. He was unfamiliar with the rules of the Senate, and many senators viewed him as an ineffective presiding officer.

== 1808 vice presidential election ==
Clinton attempted to challenge Madison for the presidency in the 1808 election, but was outmaneuvered by Madison's supporters when the congressional nominating caucus chose him as the vice presidential nominee. Clinton's supporters nonetheless put him forward as a presidential candidate, attacking the foreign policy of the Jefferson administration.

Senator Stephen R. Bradley, who had chaired the congressional nominating caucus during the 1804 presidential election, made a call for the 1808 caucus to the 146 Democratic-Republican members of the United States Congress and Federalist allies. The caucus was attended by 89 to 94 members of Congress. The caucus was held in January 1808. With the support of outgoing President Thomas Jefferson, Secretary of State James Madison won the presidential nomination over opposing candidates James Monroe and Vice President George Clinton. The caucus voted to give the vice presidential nomination to Clinton over his main opponent John Langdon, although Clinton's supporters believed Clinton would receive the Federalist Party's presidential nomination. The Federalist Party considered endorsing Clinton's candidacy, but ultimately chose to re-nominate their 1804 ticket of Charles Cotesworth Pinckney and Rufus King in September. A committee of fifteen members was selected to manage Madison's campaign.

Seventeen Democratic-Republicans in Congress opposed Madison's selection and the caucus system whose authority to select presidential and vice-presidential candidates was disputed. Clinton also opposed the caucus system. Monroe, who was supported by dissident and majority leader John Randolph, was nominated by a group of Virginia Democratic-Republicans (Old Republicans), and although he did not actively try to defeat Madison, he also refused to withdraw from the race. Clinton was also supported by a group of New York Democratic-Republicans for president even as he remained the party's official vice presidential candidate.

Clinton received just six electoral votes for president as Madison consolidated support within the party. Although Clinton had effectively run against Madison, he received the vice presidential votes of most Democratic-Republican electors, who did not want to set a precedent of defying the choice of the congressional nominating caucus. By his receiving votes for both offices in the 1808 election, Clinton became the only person to receive votes in six different electoral college contests.

== Madison's vice president ==
George Clinton and his supporters frequently opposed Madison after the 1808 election, even though Clinton was ostensibly a member of the Madison administration. Clinton helped block the appointment of Albert Gallatin as Secretary of State. He also cast an important tie-breaking vote that prevented the recharter of the First Bank of the United States.

== Notes ==
New office	Governor of New York; 1777–1795	Succeeded by John Jay
Preceded by John Jay	Governor of New York; 1801–1804	Succeeded by Morgan Lewis
Preceded by Aaron Burr	Vice President of the United States; 1805–1812	Succeeded by Elbridge Gerry
Academic offices
Preceded by Benjamin Moore; Acting	President of Columbia College; Acting; 1784–1787	Succeeded by William S. Johnson
New office	Chancellor of the University of the State of New York; 1787–1795	Succeeded by John Jay
Preceded by John Jay	Chancellor of the University of the State of New York; 1802–1804	Succeeded by Morgan Lewis
Party political offices
New political party	Democratic-Republican nominee for Governor of New York; 1792	Succeeded by Robert Yates
New political party	Democratic-Republican nominee for Vice President of the United States^{(1)} 1792	Succeeded by Aaron Burr^{(1)}
Preceded by Robert R. Livingston	Democratic-Republican nominee for Governor of New York; 1801	Succeeded by Morgan Lewis
Preceded by Aaron Burr^{(1)}	Democratic-Republican nominee for Vice President of the United States; 1804, 1808	Succeeded by John Langdon; Withdrew
Notes and references
1. Prior to the passage of the Twelfth Amendment in 1804, each presidential elector would cast two votes; the highest vote-getter with a majority would become president and the runner-up would become vice president. In 1792, with George Washington as the prohibitive favorite to be elected president, the Democratic-Republican Party fielded Clinton with the intention that he be elected vice president. Similarly, in both 1796 and 1800, the Democratic-Republican Party fielded both Aaron Burr and Thomas Jefferson, with the intention that Jefferson be elected president and Burr be elected vice president.
