= Memorandums taken on a journey from Paris into the southern parts of France and Northern Italy, in the year 1787 =

1787 historical text by Thomas Jefferson

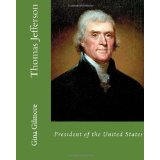
- Author: Thomas Jefferson
- Language: English
- Subject: Travelogue
- Genre: Non-fiction
- Publication place: United States
- Media type: Print

Memorandums taken on a journey from Paris into the southern parts of France and Northern Italy, in the year 1787, or Memoranda, is a collection of travel notes written by Thomas Jefferson during his journey through France and Italy in 1787. The itinerary, undertaken by the future president of the United States, lasted from 28 February to 10 June 1787. Departing from Paris, Jefferson traveled through Champagne, Burgundy, the Rhône Valley, Provence, Languedoc and the French Riviera. He also visited Piedmont, Lombardy and Liguria in northern Italy, before returning to Paris via Bordeaux, Nantes, Lorient and the Loire Valley.

Jefferson wrote the work as a guide for two young American friends, Thomas Lee Shippen and John Rutledge, following a European wine tour. The text consists largely of an extensive discussion of wines produced throughout southern France and northern Italy. Jefferson drew the material from his general travel diaries.

== Background ==
At the time of the journey Jefferson was 44 years old and served as Minister Plenipotentiary of the United States in Paris. He had already planned a trip to southern France in 1786, but postponed it after breaking his right wrist in a fall from a ladder. On doctors’ advice, he traveled to Aix-en-Provence to try the thermal waters in hopes of recovery. He also wished to inspect ports such as Marseille, Bordeaux and Lorient, as well as the Canal du Midi. Jefferson intended to travel as a private individual rather than as an official diplomat. Although he did not use a false name, he kept a low profile, leaving his daughter Martha, his aide William Short and his servants in Paris. He stated that he wished to be “master of his own secret,” employing assistants only along the way. Only in Dijon did he hire Petit Jean for the remainder of the journey.

== The journey ==
=== Organization and itinerary ===
Jefferson departed from Paris on 28 February 1787 in his own carriage, drawn by post horses that were changed roughly every ten miles. He often traveled alone, noting that solitude allowed him to reflect and learn more effectively. Roads and vehicles frequently broke down, requiring numerous repairs. He crossed Champagne and Burgundy, observing fields and crops, and reached Lyon. He then followed the Rhône Valley, passing through Vienne, Valence, Nîmes and Arles, and spent some time in Aix-en-Provence. He continued to Marseille, Toulon and Nice, where he abandoned the carriage and crossed the Maritime Alps on muleback via the Colle di Tenda. Entering the Kingdom of Sardinia, he visited Turin, Moncalieri, Milan, Pavia and Genoa, recording extensive notes on agriculture and food. To return to France, he traveled by boat along the Canal du Midi, loading his carriage onto the vessel. He then passed through Bordeaux, Nantes and Lorient, returning to Paris on 10 June 1787 after more than three months of travel.

=== Agricultural and commercial observations ===
Jefferson wrote extensively about agriculture. In the wine-producing regions of France he described vineyards, pruning methods, harvests, prices and transportation. In Burgundy he noted vineyards enclosed by dry-stone walls, while in Bordeaux he analyzed different grape varieties. In Italy he focused particularly on rice cultivated in Piedmont and Lombardy, seeking to understand how it differed from rice grown in South Carolina. Although he found few explanations, he succeeded in secretly exporting a sack of rice, despite strict prohibitions punishable by death. Near Rozzano outside Milan, he observed the production of Parmigiano Reggiano and recorded detailed notes. Another major interest was the olive tree. Jefferson studied its geographical distribution and cultivation techniques, calling it “the richest gift of heaven” and hoping to introduce it to South Carolina and Georgia. The attempt ultimately failed due to the humid climate, yet the olive remained, in his view, the most important plant of rural life.

=== Architecture and antiquities ===
During the journey Jefferson showed a strong interest in Roman remains. In Nîmes he was deeply impressed by the Maison Carrée, which later served as a model for the Virginia State Capitol in Richmond. He also visited the Pont du Gard, the Arles Amphitheatre and other ruins along his route. Carrying ancient texts on Hannibal’s march through the Alps, Jefferson attempted to identify the route taken, ultimately concluding that it was impossible to determine with certainty.

=== Climatic observations ===
The journey provided Jefferson with opportunities to record data on climate and natural conditions. Equipped with a thermometer, he measured temperatures in Nîmes, Saint-Rémy-de-Provence, Aix-en-Provence and Marseille. After crossing the Alps he discontinued temperature measurements but continued to record rainfall, snowfall and fair weather. In the mountains he observed how plant species varied with altitude, developing a scale of cold resistance including carob, orange, olive, pomegranate, walnut, fig and almond. In effect, he outlined the limits of the Mediterranean climate.

== Itinerary ==
Some of the main stops and observations made by Jefferson:

- Paris, 28 February – Departure in a light carriage without servants; stop at Fontainebleau due to wheel problems.
- Sens, 2 March – Visit to Sens Cathedral; notes on urban life and surrounding agriculture.
- Auxerre, 3 March – Fertile soil for wheat and vines, but mediocre wine; strong mules used for transport.
- Dijon, 4 March – Hires Petit Jean; observations on local potato cultivation and Burgundy vineyards.
- Beaune, 7 March – Observes vine pruning and compares wine quality and prices.
- Mâcon, 9 March – Notes enclosed vineyards, fertile landscapes and blooming orchards.
- Lyon, 11 March – Records rain and snow; observes the silk trade and cultivation of almond trees and vines.
- Valence, 17 March – Notes plains planted with wheat, clover and mulberry trees.
- Nîmes, 20 March – Visits the Maison Carrée and Pont du Gard; begins temperature measurements.
- Arles, 24 March – Visits the Arles Amphitheatre and observes sarcophagi along the road.
- Aix-en-Provence, 25 March – Tries thermal baths without benefit; records mild climate.
- Marseille, 31 March – Studies the port, visits the Château d'If, and decides to extend the journey to Italy.
- Toulon, 6 April – Visits the naval harbor and shipyards.
- Antibes, 9 April – Measures large olive trees and reflects on the importance of olive oil.
- Nice, 12 April – Leaves the carriage and crosses the Maritime Alps on muleback.
- Colle di Tenda, 14 April – Crosses the pass at over 1,800 m; notes vegetation changes and references Hannibal.
- Turin, 15 April – Observes Piedmontese agriculture and urban planning.
- Milan, 21–22 April – Visits decorated palaces and studies Parmigiano Reggiano production near Rozzano.
- Pavia, 23 April – Notes widespread production of Parmigiano cheese; observes markets and prices.
- Genoa, 25 April – Visits the port and studies commercial life; plans return to France.
- Ventimiglia, 1 May – Re-enters France via Ventimiglia, Monaco and Menton.
- Avignon, 8 May – Visits the Fontaine de Vaucluse and the Palais des Papes.
- Montpellier, 11 May – Notes gardens and botany studies.
- Toulouse, 21 May – Travels along the Canal du Midi with his carriage loaded on a barge.
- Bordeaux, 24 May – Observes Bordeaux wine vineyards; notes prices and quality.
- Nantes, 1 June – Gathers information on trade with America.
- Lorient, 2 June – Visits the port and naval facilities.
- Tours, 8 June – Describes the fertile Loire Valley.
- Orléans, 9 June – Notes agricultural plains and mills along the Loire.
- Paris, 10 June – Returns after three months and 1,200 miles, bringing extensive notes on agriculture, architecture, climate, rice and olive cultivation.

== Legacy ==
The journey of 1787 had a lasting impact on Jefferson’s ideas and work. His notes were compiled in Notes of a Tour into the Southern Parts of France, &c., which remain a valuable source for understanding France and Italy of the late 18th century. Architecturally, the Maison Carrée inspired Jefferson’s promotion of classical styles in United States public buildings. In agriculture, he sought to introduce new crops such as rice, olives and grapevines to improve American farming. The olive tree, which he called “the most interesting plant,” became a symbol of his agricultural experiments, even though it failed to adapt to the southeastern American climate. The journey exemplifies Jefferson’s Enlightenment mindset, combining direct observation, curiosity, practical interests and admiration for antiquity. His experiences in France and Italy contributed significantly to his lifelong vision of an agrarian society.

== Editions ==
- Thomas Jefferson (1997). Marco Sioli (ed.). Viaggio nel sud della Francia e nel nord d'Italia. Ibis. pp. 122. ISBN 8871640705.
