= BIHS =

The acronym BIHS may stand for:

== Schools ==
- Bishop Ireton High School
- Brooklyn International High School
- Bronx International High School
- Busan International High School
- Bluecrest International High School

== Other organisations ==
- Banco Itau Holding Financeira, S.A
- British Ice Hockey Superleague
- Beech Island Historical Society
- Block Island Historical Society
- Blennerhassett Island Historical State Park
- Brierfield Ironworks Historical State Park
