= Blennerhassett Hotel =

- U.S. National Register of Historic Places
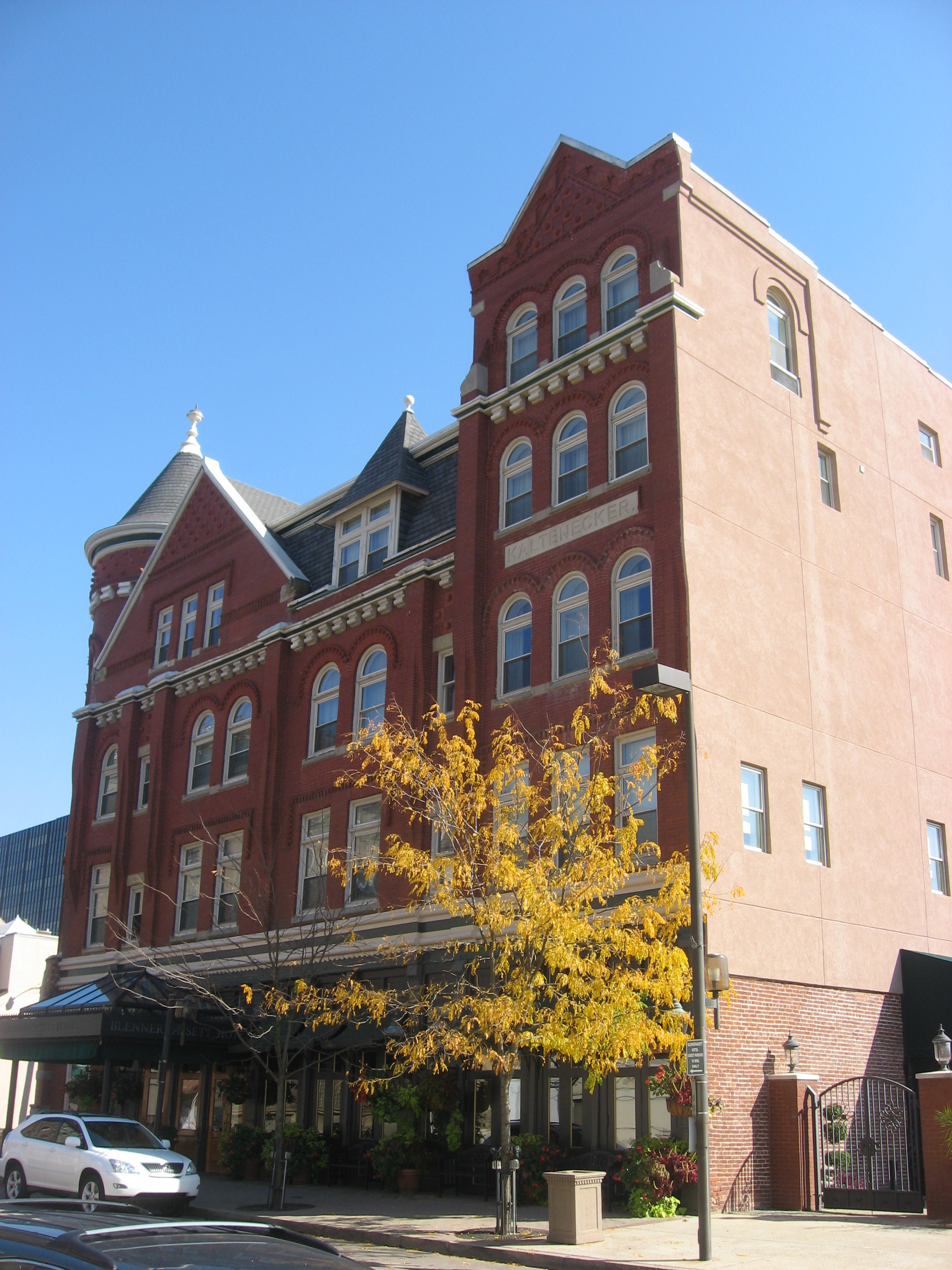
- Front of the hotel

- Location within West Virginia Location within the United States
- Location: 320 Market St., Parkersburg, West Virginia
- Coordinates: 39°15′53″N 81°33′41″W
- Area: less than one acre
- Architectural style: Queen Anne
- MPS: Downtown Parkersburg MRA
- NRHP reference No.: 82001768
- Added to NRHP: December 10, 1982

Blennerhassett Hotel is a historic hotel located at Parkersburg, Wood County, West Virginia. It opened in 1889 and is in the Queen Anne style. The hotel was listed on the National Register of Historic Places in 1982. A full restoration took place in 1986. (The hotel website states that the property is "registered as a national historic landmark". This is undoubtedly a mistake for it being placed on the National Register of Historic Places. Only about three percent of Register listings are NHLs.)

In the late 1800s, money from the oil and natural gas industries flooded into Parkersburg, West Virginia, and the town quickly became a vivacious city that welcomed businessmen and visitors from all over the country. Designed and built by William Chancellor, a prominent Parkersburg businessman, Blennerhassett opened in 1889 and quickly became a grand showplace for what would later be known as the Gaslight Era. The original hotel had approximately 50 guest rooms around a central staircase. Restrooms were common places on each of the four guest floors and the kitchen was located on the fifth floor. What is now the hotel's game room originally housed the First National Bank of Parkersburg and had the luxury of electricity.

The property was named after Harman and Margaret Blennerhassett, who settled on an island in the Ohio River in 1798 and built a Palladian mansion on their European-style estate (the island now called Blennerhassett Island). Their property was the envy of all locals, but they didn't rise to national fame until they allowed former Vice President Aaron Burr to use the island as the base of operations for his controversial military expedition. Labeled as conspirators by some, the Blennerhassetts fled down the Ohio River to escape when militia invaded the island.

== See also ==
- National Register of Historic Places listings in Wood County, West Virginia
