= Natchez expedition =

Ineffectual troop movement, War of 1812

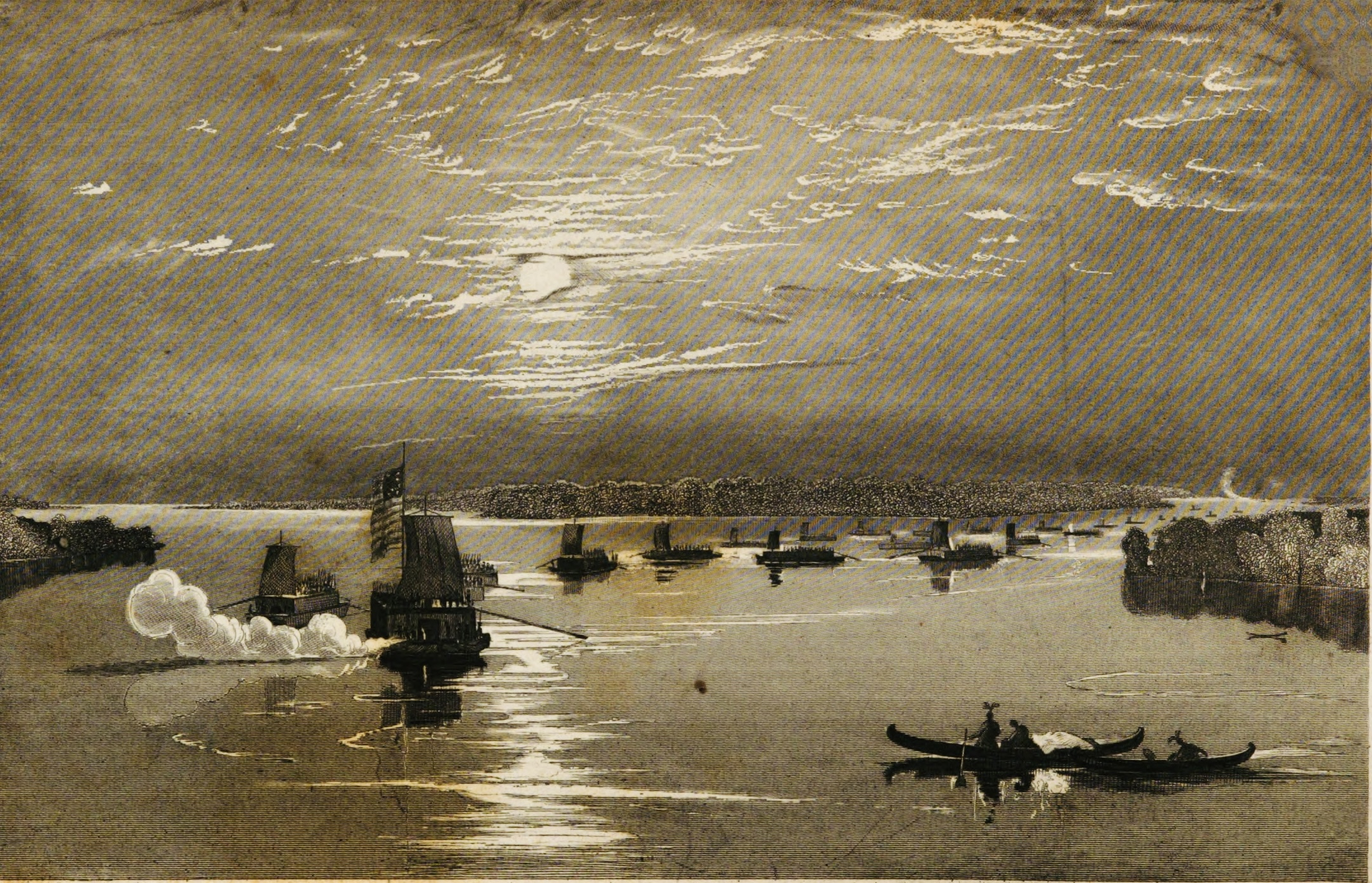
Andrew Jackson's flotilla descending the Mississippi

The Natchez expedition was a fruitless American troop movement of the southwestern theater of the War of 1812. Mustered in December 1812, volunteer militiamen departed Tennessee for the Natchez District of Mississippi Territory in January 1813. Major General commanding Andrew Jackson communicated his goals for the use of the troops the United States Department of War in a message of late 1812: "I am now at the head of 2,070 volunteers, the choicest of our citizens...if the government orders, will rejoice at the opportunity of placing the American eagle on the ramparts of Mobile, Pensacola, and Fort St. Augustine, effectually banishing from the southern coasts all British influence."

As told by the Natchez Trace Parkway historians, "When organized and ready to start on the journey, the total force consisted of 2,070 men—two regiments of infantry and a corps of cavalry under Col. John Coffee. The latter took the land route over the Natchez Trace, while the infantry, under Jackson, went by river. On February 17, 1813, the troops which had come by water disembarked and marched to the cantonment at Washington, where they were met by the cavalry under Coffee."

The men were dismissed by the War Department in April 1813 as superfluous to requirements. After they arrived, General James Wilkinson (who had been entangled with Jackson before, during the Burr conspiracy and treason trials) ordered them to go back home as they were not needed. The official orders to disband were: "War Department, February 6, 1813. [to Major General Andrew Jackson] Sir: The causes of embodying and marching to New Orleans the corps under your command having ceased to exist, you will, on the receipt of this letter, consider it as dismissed from public service, and take measures to have delivered over to Major General Wilkinson all the articles of public property which may have been put into its possession. You will accept for the corps the thanks of the President of the United States." It is possible, even likely, that Wilkinson (and the U.S. government generally) put the brakes on Jackson as a consequence of the Burr conspiracy five years prior. As a consequence of the Burr trial and surrounding political machinations: "In 1808, Jackson refused to support Madison, Jefferson's candidate for the presidency...In the War of 1812, Madison prevented the advancement of Jackson as long as possible."

Jackson marched them back up the Natchez Trace, which is said to be when people first started calling him Old Hickory. Jackson borrowed $1,000 from James Jackson to pay for wagons to haul the sick and provision them with cornmeal, flour, and beef. After they returned to Nashville, Jackson sent young Thomas Hart Benton (later to become a U.S. Senator from Missouri known as "Old Bullion" Benton) to negotiate for reimbursement. While Benton was away in Washington, D.C, hustling to get an appropriation to cover Jackson's expenses, his brother Jesse Benton got shot in the butt in an "affair of honor," and Tom Benton blamed Jackson. Shortly thereafter the Jackson accosted the Benton brothers at a Nashville tavern and the Bentons, Jackson, John Coffee, Stockley D. Hays, and Alexander Donelson threw down, complete with punching, knifing, and gunfire. In the course of the Talbot's Hotel brawl Jesse Benton shot Jackson in the shoulder. Thomas Hart Benton reconciled with Jackson years later and eventually became his legislative ally in bank smashing. Jesse Benton and Andrew Jackson never came to terms.

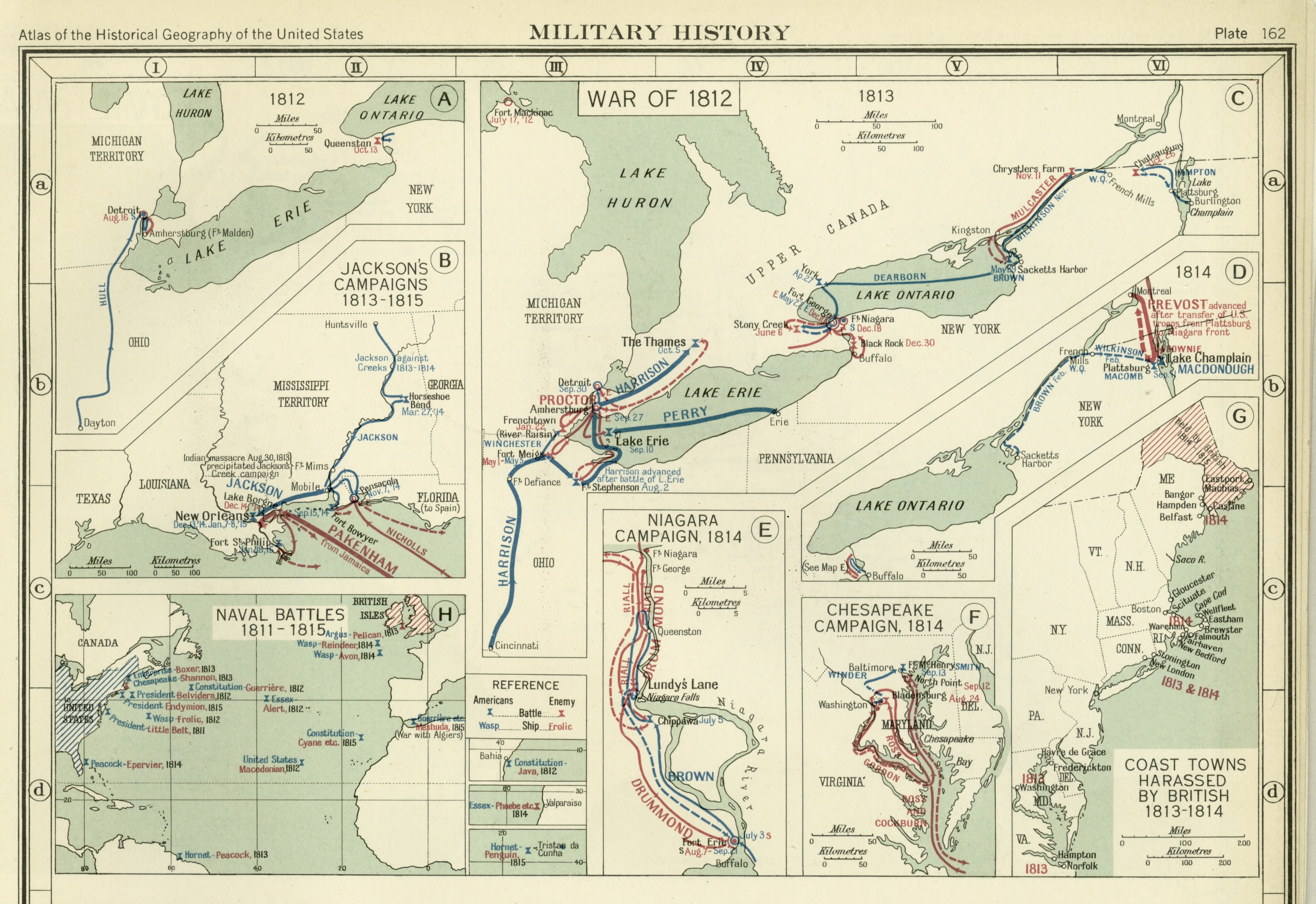
War of 1812 including Jackson's campaigns

The commanders were:

- Andrew Jackson, Major General, commanding
  - John Coffee, cavalry regiment colonel
  - William Hall, infantry regiment colonel
  - Thomas H. Benton, infantry regiment colonel
  - William B. Lewis, major and quartermaster
  - William Carroll, brigade inspector
  - John Reid, Aide and Secretary to the General

Thomas Jones Hardeman, namesake of Hardeman County, Tennessee, was also a quartermaster of Jackson's troops. Jackson's chaplains on this expedition were Revs. James Gwin and Learner Blackman. Blackman kept a journal of the expedition which has been preserved and is a valuable primary source on the personalities involved. Described as an "abortive" outing, the trip "nonetheless established Jackson as a military leader," and ultimately served as preparation for the Creek War against the Red Sticks following the Fort Mims massacre in August 1813. With the Natchez Expedition, the 46-year-old Jackson had "now entered upon the military career for which he thought himself fitted by nature and for which he ardently wished."

Jackson and Coffee managed to address some unfinished business relating to the Burr conspiracy while on the road under the aegis of the U.S. Army. Harman Blannerhassett was suing Aaron Burr to get back funds invested, and Jackson was listed as a garnishee, and he was threatened with blackmail by Blannerhassett's lawyer Jonathan Thompson. According to the editors of The Papers of Andrew Jackson, "While in Mississippi on the Natchez expedition, both Jackson and John Coffee filed depositions with the [Adams County] court on March 25, 1813...The case was continued from the April to the October session, 1813, with Jackson again summoned. Then preparing to leave with his troops for the Creek country and unable to attend, Jackson filed another deposition, supported by a statement from William Eastin."

== See also ==
- Georgia–Florida Patriot War (1812–1814)
- James Wilkinson § War of 1812 and capture of Fort Charlotte, Mobile
- Battle of Pensacola (1814)
- Rhea letter and first Seminole War (1818)
- Andrew Jackson and the slave trade
- Washington, Mississippi
- Old Greenville, Mississippi
- Bruinsburg, Mississippi
