= Beam Center =

American youth development organization

- A session of campers standing alongside Beam Salvage Station No. 9, one of Beam Center's signature "big projects."
- Merged into: Beam Camp
- Formation: 2011
- Founder: Brian Cohen, Danny Kahn
- Type: Nonprofit organization
- Tax ID no.: 45-4273449
- Purpose: Youth development and education
- Location: Red Hook, Brooklyn
- Chair emeritus: Danny Kahn
- Board of directors: Juliette Adams, Amy Batallones, Ahmad Choudhry, Nicole Kim, Philip Kim, Kathy Larchian, Jennifer Mangino, Vanessa Torres, Aaron Weymouth
- Employees: 30+
- Website: https://www.beamcenter.org

Beam Center, founded in 2011 by former Elektra Records executives Brian Cohen and Danny Kahn, is a youth development and education organization based in Red Hook, Brooklyn that has offered in-school, after-school, and summer camp public education programming since 2012.

== After-school and in-school programming ==
Since 2012, Beam Center has conducted workshops for second grade to high school students in applied arts, architecture, building, design, and engineering, among others. Working with more than 25 schools each year, Beam Center creates curriculum that provides an alternative to traditional in-school instruction. They also offer an Apprentice program, which provides youth with the opportunity to foster their leadership and job-related skills.

== Summer camps ==
Beam Center's longest-running program is an annual sleepaway summer camp called Beam Camp, which has won an Archinect award. Based in Strafford, New Hampshire, Beam Camp solicits yearly proposals for design projects and constructs them with a team of 100+ campers and professionals from various fields.

In July 2021, Beam Center opened Beam Camp City, a summer day camp adjunct to Beam Center on Governors Island in partnership with the New York City Department of Education and The Trust for Governors Island.

== History ==
In 2004, Brian Cohen, then senior vice president for marketing at Elektra Records, left to form a summer camp inspired partially by his experience at 'the Lighthouse,' an art and music camp in Pine Grove, Pennsylvania. Naming it "Beam" as a partial homage to the Lighthouse, Cohen's plan for a summer camp evolved into a plan wherein staff and campers would work together to build a large, 'iconic' project each summer. Alongside Danny Kahn, another former Elektra Records executive, Cohen joined the American Camping Association and began searching for a site to build their camp.

Beam Camp began the next summer in 2005, eventually finding its home at a former Boy Scouts of America campsite in Strafford, New Hampshire. Each summer, campers and staff work together to create large-scale, multi-part creations like a giant "Nexus Canopy" in 2005— modular wood and canvas units that could be rearranged into theaters, mazes, and other spaces; "Creatura" in 2014 — a 20-foot human-powered vessel floating on the camp lake; and "Pipe Tree" in 2016 — a “fully-functioning, human-operated pipe organ” nestled amongst (and shaped like) the trees in the forest.

The camp ran for 5 years as a standalone organization, until Beam Center was founded in 2011 in New York City, aiming to bring the Beam Camp experience to kids who couldn't afford or didn't receive a scholarship for the limited space available at camp. Iterating on their 'big project' model, Beam Center began working with Brooklyn International High School, building a giant interactive sculpture and teaching "programming, carpentry, metalwork and digital storytelling skills."

In the 2013-2014 school year, Beam became a contracted vendor with the New York City Department of Education.

== Inventgenuity Festival ==
In 2010, Beam Center began hosting the Inventgenuity Festival, a free event that invites anyone aged 6-18 to enroll in workshops centered around the arts and sciences.
