= Jonathan Thompson (lawyer) =

American lawyer and land speculator (1782–1823)

- Born: December 22, 1782; Massachusetts
- Died: August 26, 1823 (aged 40); Mississippi
- Occupation: Lawyer

Jonathan Thompson (December 22, 1782 – August 26, 1823) was an American lawyer and land speculator of the Natchez District in Mississippi, United States, active during the territorial and early statehood period. Originally from Massachusetts, he reportedly traveled to Mississippi Territory with Aaron Burr in 1806 in the flotilla now associated with the Burr conspiracy. He is best remembered today for his ownership of what are now historic antebellum mansions; for helping his client Harman Blennerhassett attempt to obtain repayment from Aaron Burr and Andrew Jackson for expenditures made during the Burr expedition (Thompson allegedly tried to extort Jackson, Jackson allegedly threatened to hang Thompson); and for dying with his family in the 1823 yellow fever outbreak in Natchez. Winthrop Sargent, the first governor of Mississippi Territory, was his brother-in-law. Surviving records of his indebted estate have been used by researchers studying the financial systems of the early years of the Cotton Kingdom U.S. South and the impact of the Panic of 1819 on the planter class.

== Early career ==
Thompson is believed to have been born in 1782 in Massachusetts to Betty and Thaddeus Thompson. Thompson traveled to the Mississippi Territory in the winter of 1806–07, in company with Aaron Burr, as part of what is known as the Burr expedition.

He worked as a lawyer and one of his clients was Winthrop Sargent, first governor of Mississippi Territory.

Spanish grants were confirmed to him in Concordia Parish, Louisiana, one on the site of present-day Ferriday.

His first local real estate transaction in the Natchez District was a deal with John S. Miller in 1808.

== Pursuit of Andrew Jackson for debts ==
In 1812, in his capacity as attorney for Harman Blennerhassett, who was in "financial distress," Jonathan Thompson wrote to future U.S. president Andrew Jackson and "attempted to extort the funds that Aaron Burr and Alston allegedly owed him, by threatening to publish documents in his hands".

From Jonathan Thompson Natchez July 3d. 1812 Sir There has been lately put in my hands by a person to whom Col. A. Burr is indebted among other papers an account Current apparntly in your hand writing and between you and him on which appears a balance due to Col B. of $1726.62½.1 The person who put these papers in my hands wishes to have his debt, and has instructed me to write you on the subject. My object now is to learn from you whether the said balance is yet due from you and if not when and how it has been paid. No person is acquainted with these circumstances except the one who gave me the papers and myself & it would be with reluctance that he would be the cause of their being further made known. I should be glad to hear from you on the subject of this letter as soon as may meet your convenience. I am Respectfully your obdt. Sevt J. Thompson

Jackson ignored the pressure, and took the issue to court. According to the editors of The Papers of Andrew Jackson, "While in Mississippi on the Natchez expedition, both Jackson and John Coffee filed depositions with the [Adams County] court on March 25, 1813...The case was continued from the April to the October session, 1813, with Jackson again summoned. Then preparing to leave with his troops for the Creek country and unable to attend, Jackson filed another deposition, supported by a statement from William Eastin." The Adams Court ultimately decided that Jackson owed no debt to Blannerhasset, or Burr. Josiah Snelling later wrote—in a biography produced in opposition to Jackson's 1832 presidential campaign—that the editor of the Natchez Ariel reported that Jackson had "'threatened to hang the attorney [Thompson] to the first tree, or highest tree,' if he attempted to arrest him on that account. We do not pretend to vouch for the accuracy of this report, but we do know the friends of the attorney were in the habit of quizzing him on this subject for some time after the general left this [area]."

== Business dealings ==
Thompson was married to Anna Williams in Adams County, Mississippi Territory on January 19, 1814. Through this marriage Winthrop Sargent became his brother-in-law. In 1816, Thompson's brother-in-law David Williams lent him US$20,000 (equivalent to $379,412 in 2025); Thompson put up 32 slaves as collateral. In addition to Sargent and Williams, Thompson often did business with David L. Trask, who was originally from Massachusetts and was typically addressed using the honorific colonel. Their partnership involved "operation of cotton plantations with enslaved labor and speculation in bank stock and steamboat stocks, to endorsing notes and loans for one another for a number of investments in the area." Thompson once tried to help Trask's brother Israel E. Trask get a loan from a Natchez bank. He became a member of the American Antiquarian Society in 1814.

In 1819 he was a founding board member of a planned school called Natchez Academy, along with Henry Postlethwaite, John Henderson, John Hankinson, James Foster, Elijah Smith, Daniel D. Elliott, Charles B. Green, James Metcalfe, Edward Turner, John Hosmer, Henry Huntingdon, Lyman Harding, and William Bullitt. The Panic of 1819 triggered new financial strains on Thompson, so he borrowed $3,400 from Sargent and by July "with cotton prices in freefall, he borrowed more, and soon he owed Sargent more than $13,000."

In 1822 he was named trustee of what was to become Trinity Episcopal Church in Natchez, in company with Benjamin Farar, John Minor, James Moore, Richard G. Ellis, Jos. E. Davis, Robert Moore, John T. Griffith, James C. Williams, James K. Cook, and Henry Stark. He was appointed to the building committee with Stephen Duncan, Henry Postlethwaite, Martin Whiting, and Wm. B. Griffith.

According to Adams County legal records, in 1823, Thompson sold 1,000 arpents of land to Stephen Duncan; this property later became known as Saragossa Plantation.

By the 1820s, Thompson had become a heavily leveraged, mid-tier planter. William Kenner & Co. appears to have served as cotton factor to both Thompson and Sargent.

== Homes ==
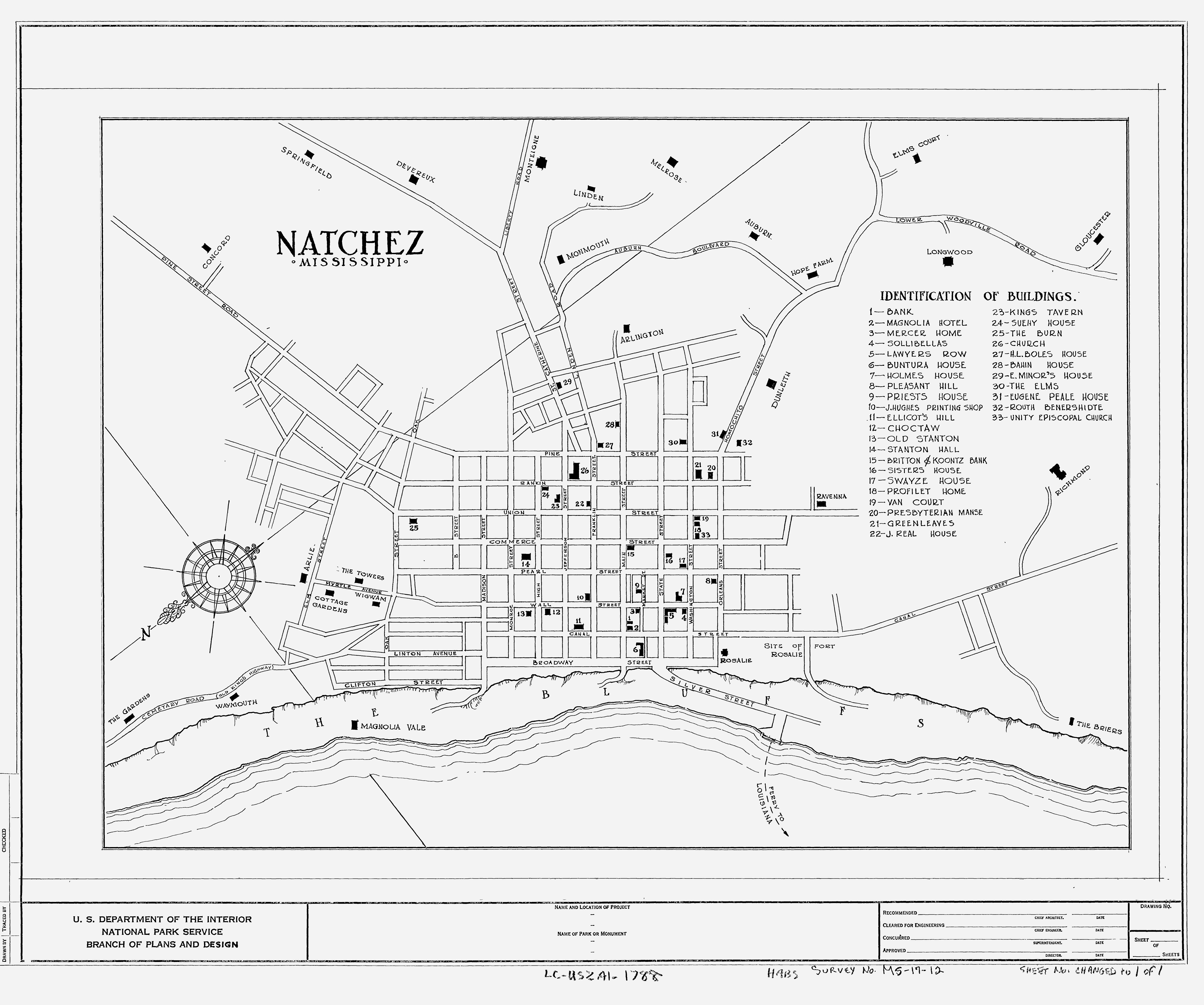
Natchez City Map created by the Historic American Buildings Survey, showing location of Arlington and Green Leaves

- Arlington: In the 1810s he had some part in the ownership or construction of Arlington house in Natchez. The history of Arlington, and many other Natchez-area structures, has been clouded by shoddy research produced during the New Deal era by Edith Moore for the Historic American Buildings Survey. Archival research shows that Thompson built Arlington sometime between 1816 and 1821. According to the National Register of Historic Places nomination form for Arlington, produced in 1973, "Deed records indicate that a land speculator, Jonathan Thompson, owned the property from 1814 to 1818, when he sold it to [Jane Surget, wife of John Hampton White]; the deed mentions 'extensive improvements'."
- He may have been responsible for construction of the historically significant mansion Hawthorne—the house was possibly built "as early as 1818."
- According to historian Clayton James, Thompson was one of the local "men of wealth [who] lived in both town and country," maintaining Green Leaves in town and Hawthorne in the country. He is considered the first owner of a Natchez house now known as Green Leaves; as he "owned the entire square, and there is a probability that he erected Green Leaves as a town house, it being the custom of the wealthy at that time to maintain several establishments," as told by Catherine Van Court's In Old Natchez (1937).

== Death ==
The August–September 1823 outbreak of yellow fever in Natchez was virulent and devastating. According to an account published in a Vermont newspaper on September 30:

Distressing accounts continue to be received of the ravages of the yellow fever at Natchez. The city had been nearly depopulated by death and the flight of the inhabitants. Out of 5,000 inhabitants, not more than two or three hundred were left. Every avenue was thronged with fugitives, with a portion of their property escaping for their lives. The confusion was as great as if the city had been enveloped in flames. Several physicians had been attacked, and the faculty had recommended the immediate removal of all persons, both sick and well, and given notice that they intended to fly themselves, as they had not been able to effect a single cure. Of the 200 who remained, 49 had died during the five days preceding the 1st of Sept. On that day there were 13 deaths. The fever is attributed to the overflowing of the river early in the season.

The 1823 infections seemed to take a rapid course to mortality, with many victims dying within 12 hours of being found symptomatic.

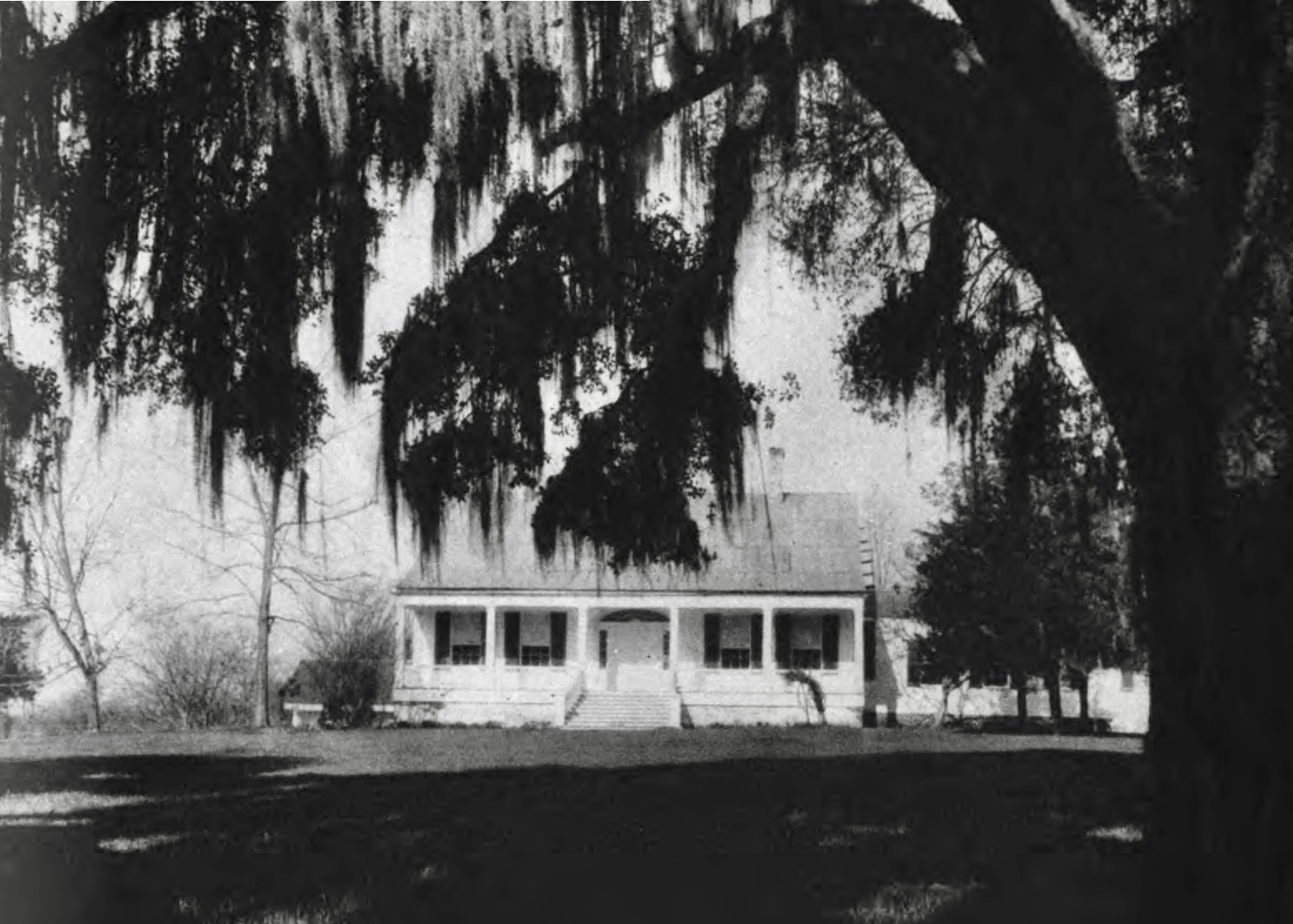
Hawthorne house on the Natchez Trace in Mississippi, described as "within calling distance of the Lower Woodville road"

According to one Natchez history, "Thompson and his family died of yellow fever while they prepared to leave the city to stay at Hawthorne." A newspaper death list included "Jonathan Thompson and wife" among those who died "in the country" (as opposed to in the city), between August 19 and September 5, 1823. They reportedly had three children who died at the same time of the same cause.

Physician Samuel A. Cartwright, who wrote an article about "malignant fever" for an 1826 issue of the Medical Recorder of Philadelphia, recorded of the 1823 yellow fever outbreak in Natchez, that "it is worthy of remark, that until the 25th, when 17 died of yellow fever, the disease was principally confined to the southern district of the city and suburbs, which contained the putrid animal matter. Families living in the suburbs of the southern and eastern parts of the city, among whom were that of Mr. Jonathan Thompson, and several hands belonging to Mr. Breill, were attacked sooner than those who lived in the block of the northern district."

A description of Thompson's final hours appeared in La Roché's 1855 study of yellow fever:

Dr. Merrill, formerly of Natchez, now of Memphis, Tennessee, relates the following interesting case: "In 1823, I was summoned to the wife of Mr. Jonathan Thompson, who had just been moved some 3 miles (4.8 km) from the city, upon the first alarm of the epidemic. Mr. T., whom I had never before seen, received me upon a gallery, and while awaiting for a few moments for the patient to invite me in, I observed, to my great surprise, that in the intervals of conversation, he gulped up whole mouthfuls of black-vomit. I intimated to him that he himself appeared to need assistance; but he repelled me in a decided manner, and said: 'wish you only to prescribe for my wife'. I sought out his nephew, who was an inmate of the family, and told him his uncle had but a few hours to live, and if he wished to make his will he had no time to lose, but in two or three hours time he would be incapable of doing it. A friend was sent for from the city; but it was too late. He was demented on his arrival, and remained so until he died, discharging all the while immense quantities of black vomit."

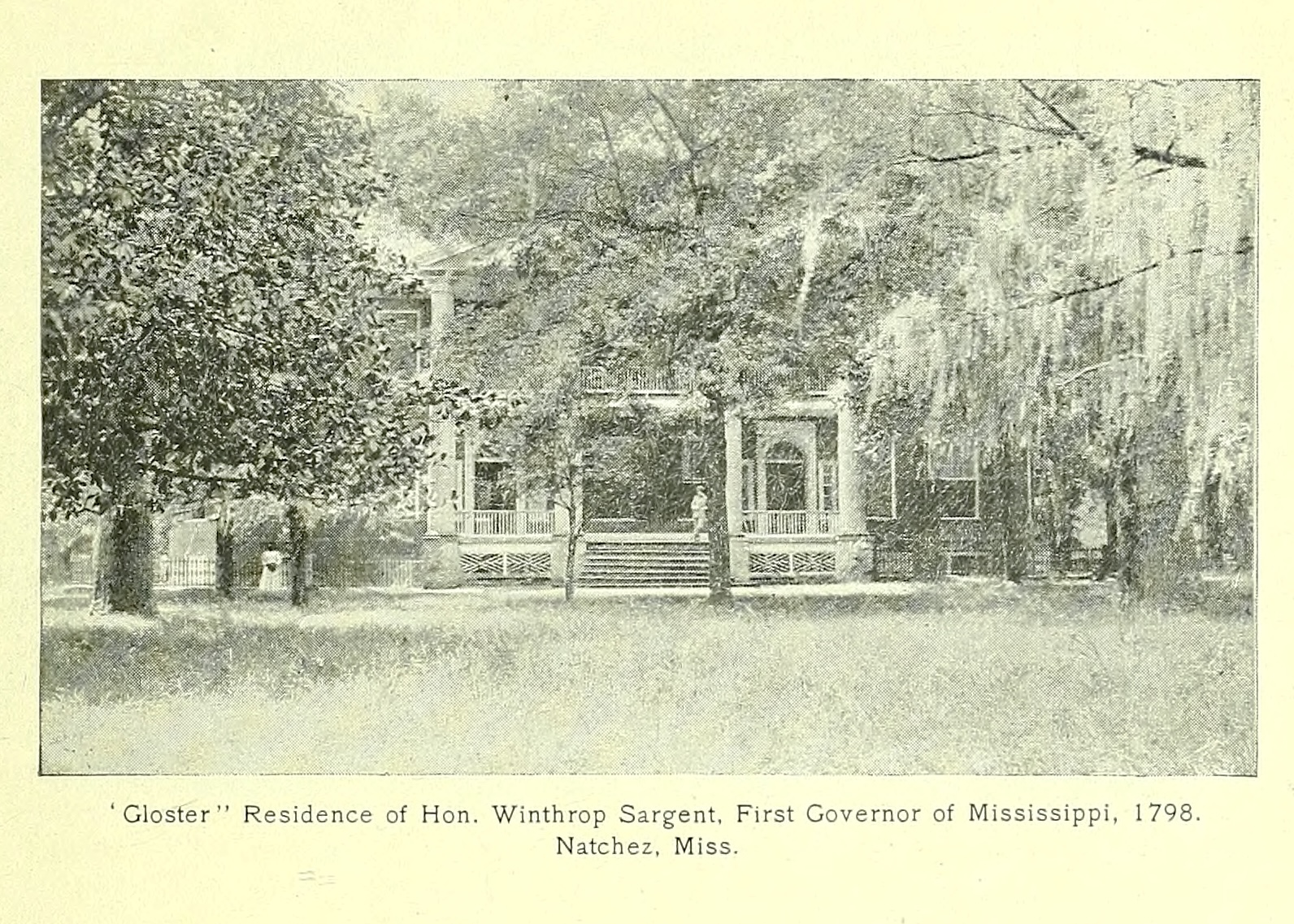
Gloucester (Natchez, Mississippi), photographed 1897

According to Van Court, "A brick vault was hastily constructed to receive their bodies, and the family was buried together. Their untimely death left a tremendous estate to distant relatives and connections." He was interred at Gloucester Cemetery at Gloucester House, alongside other early Mississippi notables including Sargent and S. S. Prentiss. The vault is inscribed "Sacred To the Memory Jonathan Thompson Esquire and Anna his wife, also of their children who departed this life August 1823." Surnames of other people in the cemetery include Percy, Davis, and Eustis.

== Estate ==
Real estate held in his name included two plantations, Pine Grove and Bradley, along with his townhome in Natchez. His personal property was valued at $13,207 circa 1823. At the time of his death he was the legal owner of 97 enslaved people worth approximately $30,000. He had two real estate mortgages and 33 mortgages on enslaved people. He was owed approximately US$59,000 (equivalent to $1,585,625 in 2025) at the time of his death, of which US$52,000 (equivalent to $1,397,500 in 2025) was deemed by his executors to be likely unrecoverable. He owed $13,000 to Sargent and had borrowed and not yet repaid $10,000 from Trask to cover a prior debt owed Sargent.

There were also 60 creditors holding 64 claims against his estate "amounting to an uncollateralized debt against him of $84,007." His debt and credit relationships were predominantly local and "had little connection to larger networks of international credit." An 1824 auction of Thompson's real and personal property took place over six days and yielded approximately $39,400. Newspaper notices published in 1826 represented the estate to be insolvent.

== Sources ==
- Browning, Andrew H. (2019). The Panic of 1819: The First Great Depression. Columbia, Missouri: University of Missouri Press. ISBN 978-0-8262-7425-0. LCCN 2018044145. OCLC 1052905245. Project MUSE book 63599.
- Cartwright, Samuel A. (January 1826). Colhoun, Samuel (ed.). "A Series of Essays: On the Causes, Symptoms, Morbid Anatomy, and Treatment of Some of the Principal Diseases of the Southern States". Medical Recorder (Part I: Malignant Fever). IX (I). Philadelphia: J. Webster: 3–44 – via Google Books.
- David, Elbra Lilli (2018). Commodification, Slavery, Credit and the Law in the Lower Mississippi River Valley, 1780–1830 (Thesis). UC Irvine.
- James, D. Clayton (1993) [1968]. Antebellum Natchez. Baton Rouge, Louisiana: Louisiana State University Press. ISBN 978-0-8071-1860-3. LCCN 68028496. OCLC 28281641.
- Kapp, Paul Hardin (2022). Heritage and Hoop Skirts: How Natchez Created the Old South. Jackson: University Press of Mississippi. ISBN 978-1-4968-3879-7. LCCN 2022014500. OCLC 1311168633.
- La Roche, René (1855). Yellow Fever, Considered in Its Historical, Pathological, Etiological, and Therapeutical Relations: Including a Sketch of the Disease as it Has Occurred in Philadelphia from 1699 to 1854, with an Examination of the Connections Between it and the Fevers Known Under the Same Name in Other Parts of Temperate, as Well as in Tropical, Regions. Vol. I. Philadelphia: Blanchard and Lea. OCLC 14832379.
- Snelling, W. Joseph (1831). A Brief and Impartial History of the Life and Actions of Andrew Jackson, President of the United States, by A Free Man. Boston: Stimpson and Clapp. hdl:loc.gdc/scd0001.00118962965. LCCN 11021109. OCLC 1114508. OL 22862330M.
- Various; Jackson, Andrew (1984). Moser, Harold D.; MacPherson, Sharon (eds.). The Papers of Andrew Jackson, Volume II, 1804–1813. University of Tennessee Press. ISBN 978-0-8704-9441-3.
- Young, Amy L. (2004). "The Beginning and Future of African American Archaeology in Mississippi". Historical Archaeology. 38 (1): 66–78. ISSN 0440-9213. JSTOR 25617132.
