= Blennerhassett Island =

Island in the Ohio River in West Virginia, United States

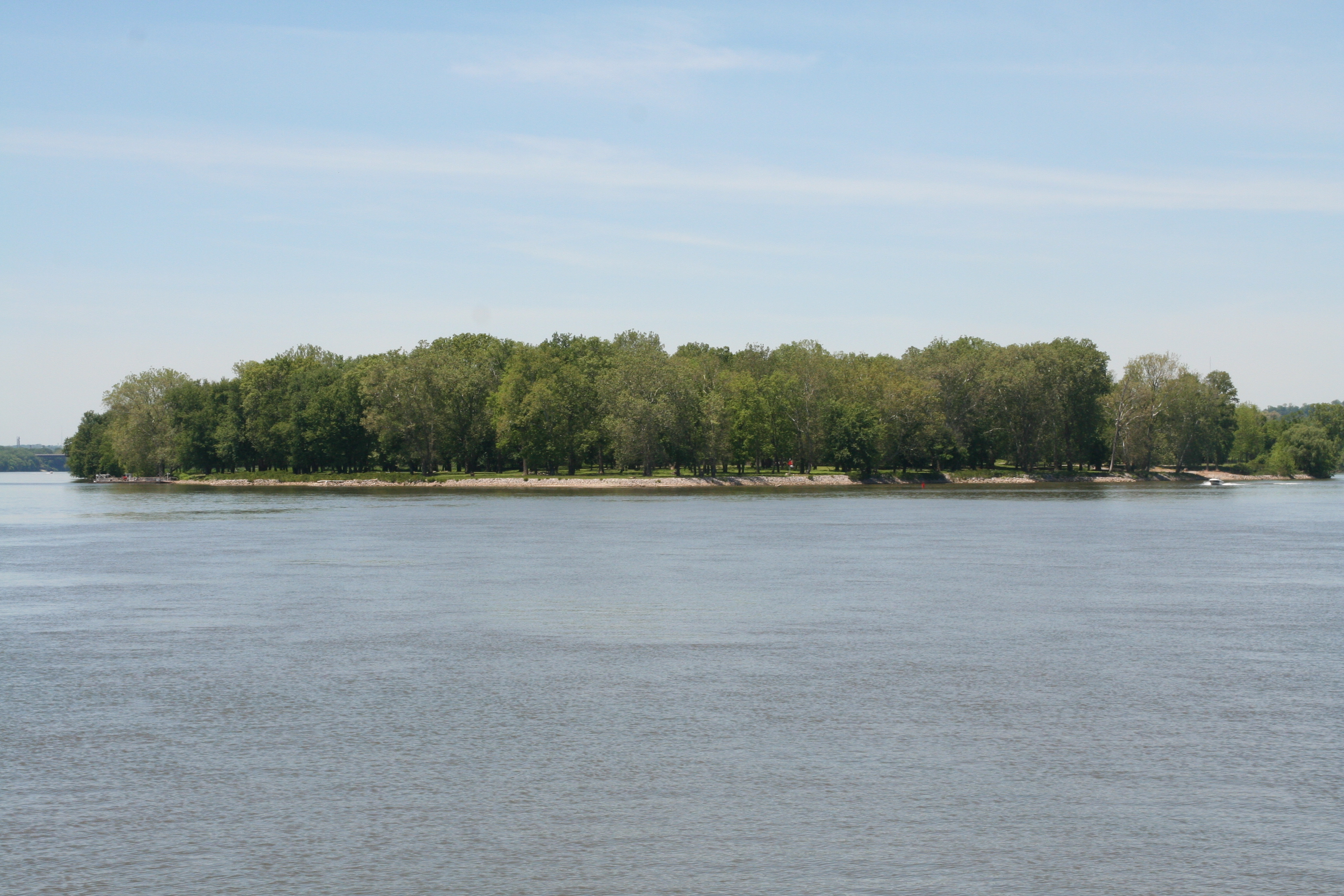
- East end of Blennerhassett Island
- Interactive map of Blennerhassett Island

Geography
- Location: Ohio River, West Virginia
- Coordinates: 39°16′16″N 81°37′32″W

Administration
- United States

Blennerhassett Island is an island on the Ohio River below the mouth of the Little Kanawha River, near Parkersburg in Wood County, West Virginia, United States.

Historically, Blennerhassett Island was occupied by Native Americans. Nemacolin, chief of the Delaware Nation, made it his last home, dying in 1767. European Americans knew it as Backus Island, named for Elijah Backus, who purchased it in 1792 in the wave of westward settlement following the American Revolutionary War.

In 1798, Harman Blennerhassett, a figure in the Aaron Burr "treason" conspiracy, purchased the east end of the island with his wife Margaret Agnew and it became known by their name. Their residence, Blennerhassett House, where Burr and Blennerhassett are alleged to have plotted treason against the United States in the Burr Conspiracy, burned to the ground in 1811. That area has been designated the Blennerhassett Island Historical State Park and the island was named for him.

== See also ==
- Blennerhassett Island Bridge
- List of islands of West Virginia
- List of West Virginia state parks
