= Blennerhassett Island Historical State Park =

State park in Wood County, West Virginia

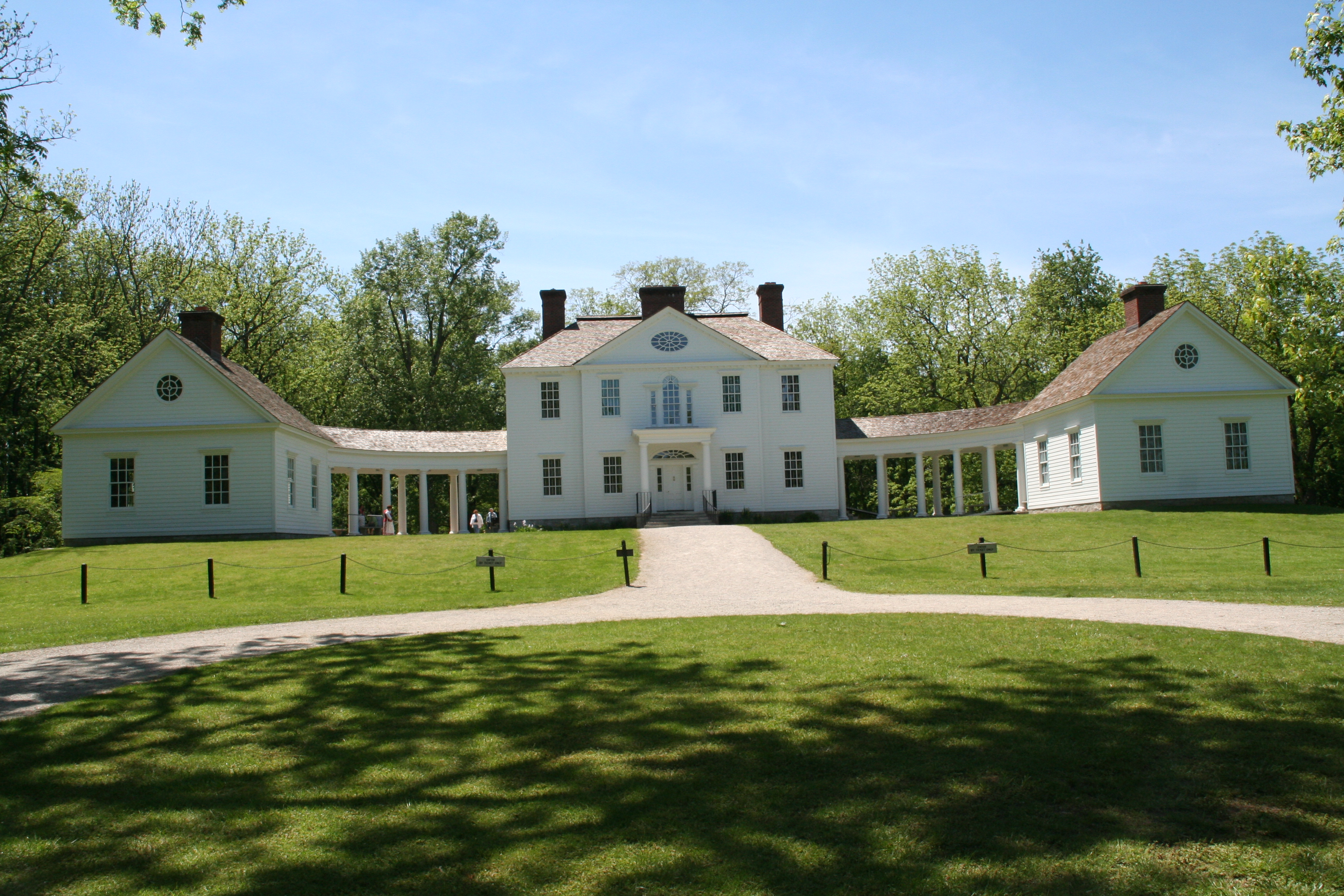
- Reconstructed Blennerhassett Mansion, 2008

- Location within West Virginia
- Location: Wood, West Virginia, United States
- Coordinates: 39°16′19″N 81°37′29″W
- Area: 511 acres (207 ha)
- Elevation: 575 ft (175 m)
- Website: wvstateparks.com/park/blennerhassett-island-historical-state-park/
- Blennerhassett Island Historic District
- U.S. National Register of Historic Places
- U.S. Historic district
- Location within West Virginia Location within the United States
- Nearest city: Parkersburg, West Virginia
- Area: 508.6 acres (205.8 ha)
- Built: 1799
- NRHP reference No.: 72001294
- Added to NRHP: September 7, 1972

Blennerhassett Island Historical State Park is a state park located on Blennerhassett Island, a small island in the Ohio River, located in Wood County, West Virginia, USA. The property was the site of a Palladian mansion owned by Harman Blennerhassett, a participant in some of the alleged intrigues of Aaron Burr, and his wife Margaret Agnew. While the original mansion burned to the ground in 1811, a detailed replica, which can be toured, was built on its foundations in the 1980s. The Blennerhasset Mansion is built in a Federal architectural style with, Palladian attributes.

The park is accessed via sternwheeler riverboat from Point Park on 2nd Street in Parkersburg, West Virginia. The riverboat ride takes about 20 minutes each way.

== Blennerhassett Museum of Regional History ==
The Blennerhassett Museum of Regional History operates in conjunction with the state park. The Museum is located two blocks from the riverboat landing at the corner of 2nd and Juliana Streets. Exhibits focus on the regional history of west and central West Virginia, and include household furnishings, art, clothing, and prehistoric Native American tools, jewelry, weapons and items. Admission is separate from the park.

== Features ==
- Horsedrawn carriage rides
- Restored 1802 Putnam-Houser House
- Gift shop
- Picnic shelters
- Bicycle rentals
- Hiking

== Accessibility ==
West Virginia University assessed the park's accessibility to the disabled in 2005, and rated its facilities as "accessible" by the standards of the Americans with Disabilities Act.

Drawing of the Blennerhassett home, circa 1800.

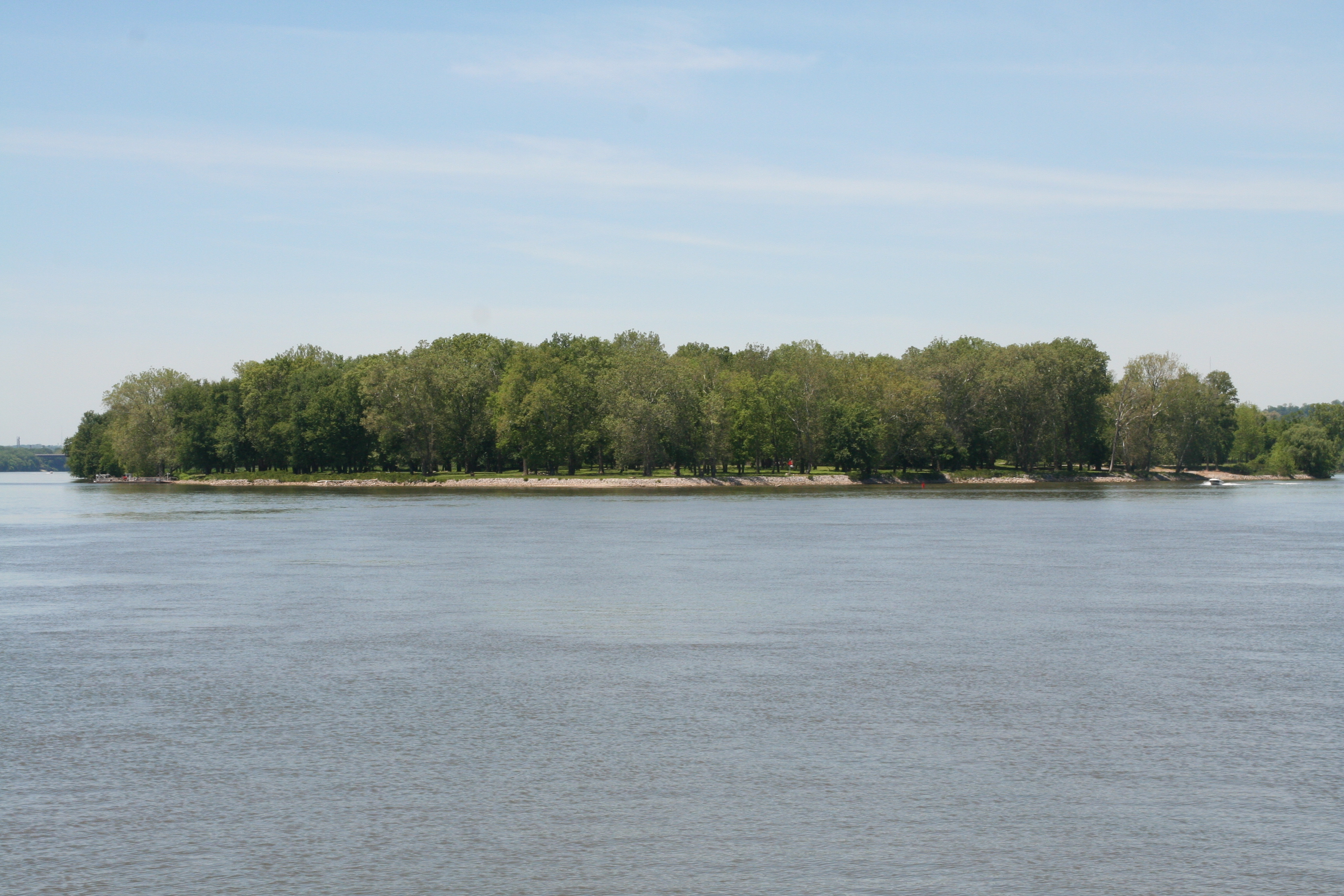
North end of Blennerhassett Island

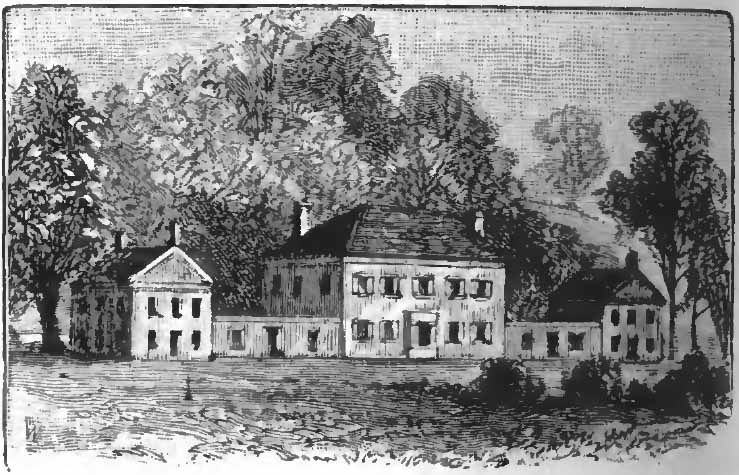
Drawing from Appleton's Cyclopædia of American Biography

== See also ==
- Blennerhassett Island Bridge
- National Register of Historic Places listings in Wood County, West Virginia
- List of West Virginia state parks
