= Margaret Agnew Blennerhassett =

English-American poet

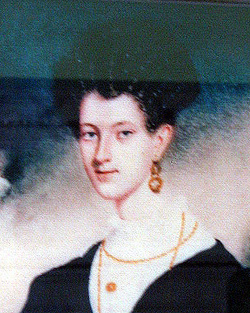
- Born: 1771; Bishop Auckland, England
- Died: 1842 (aged 70–71)
- Citizenship: England
- Occupations: English -American poet and artistocrat

Margaret Agnew Blennerhassett (1771 – June 16, 1842) was an English-American poet and aristocrat.

== Life ==
Margaret Agnew was born in 1771, in Bishop Auckland, England. Her father, Robert Agnew, was the lieutenant governor of the Isle of Man. Margaret defied social and religious conventions by marrying her maternal uncle, Harman Blennerhassett, a wealthy Irish aristocrat. They shared a 7,000-acre estate in County Kerry until 1795, when their union and Harman's revolutionary ideals prompted them to sell the estate and immigrate to America.

Margaret is said to have been above average height with brown hair and blue eyes. She often wore her hair bound in a silk headdress. She wrote and spoke French and Italian fluently. She would often accompany her husband on hunting trips and enjoyed horseback riding.

The couple left London and sailed to New York City in America. Once there they traveled south to Pittsburgh, PA and then chartered a boat down the Ohio River. The couple settled briefly in Marietta, Ohio. In 1797, they purchased 174 acres of land on an island in the upper Ohio River, in Wood County, Virginia (now West Virginia). The island is located two miles below present-day Parkersburg, West Virginia, a town which was named Newport until 1810. This land originally belonged to George Washington. The 7,000-square foot Blennerhassett Mansion was constructed between 1798 and 1800. In the meantime, the couple lived in a blockhouse near their property.

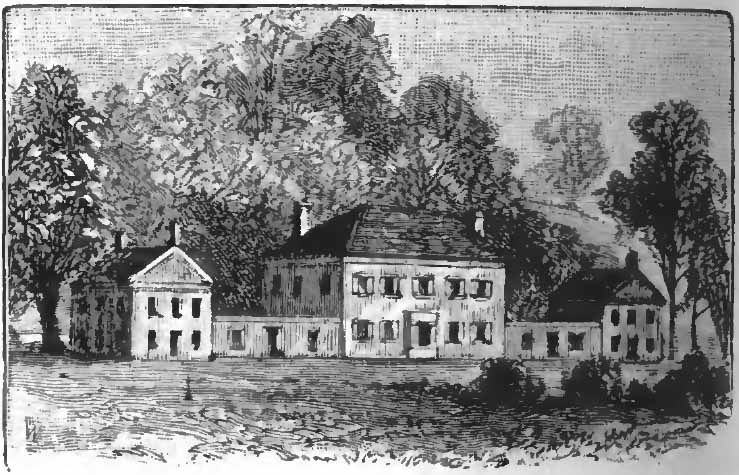
Sketch of the mansion

At the Blennerhassett Mansion, Margaret entertained travelers of the Ohio Valley in the mansion with dancing, music, and readings of poetry and Shakespeare. Among the most famous guests was former vice president Aaron Burr, who sought the financial support of numerous wealthy landowners including Harman Blennerhassett. Between 1805 and 1806, Harman and Burr took part in an allegedly treasonous conspiracy to either annex Texas or form a new country in the western United States. While Margaret was in Marietta, Harman and his associates boarded boats and escaped down the river into the Mississippi Territory. The following day, the militia of Wood County, Virginia, ransacked the mansion, despite Margaret's pleas to spare their home. She was forced to flee down the river with her two children in tow.

Harman Blennerhassett and Aaron Burr were both arrested and imprisoned in the Virginia State Penitentiary until they were granted freedom. The trial in Richmond had exhausted the Blennerhassett's accounts. The following years were met with financial hardships and moving through different states and countries. The Blennerhassetts first turned to growing cotton in Mississippi. During the War of 1812 embargo, they relocated to Montreal, Quebec, Canada. After Harman tried and failed at setting up a law firm, he returned to Europe while Margaret and the children stayed in Montreal.

In 1825, Margaret and her children joined Harman in Europe. Harman died in 1831. Margaret remained in Europe until 1842, when she and son Harman Jr., returned to the United States. She petitioned Congress for restitution for the Blennerhassett Mansion’s destruction alongside Henry Clay, who was previously involved in defending Burr and her husband and had learned that she was residing in a New York tenement and was struggling to support her severely afflicted son. Clay, recognizing the injustice that had befallen her, attempted to persuade Congress to provide her with a modest compensation for the destruction of her home, years after the tragic events that had happened. Although a Senate committee voted in favor of her appeal, she died June 16, 1842, in a poor house in New York City. The Sisters of Charity buried her in a New York cemetery.

Together Margaret and Harman had six children. Two sons, Dominic (1799) and Harman (1803), were born to them during their time on the island. A baby girl, named Margaret, was also born during their time on the island but did not survive infancy. Another girl also named Margaret was born during their time in Mississippi. Their youngest child, Joseph, was born in 1812.

Their home on the island remained empty for many years before finally burning to the ground. Between 1984 and 1991, the State of West Virginia reconstructed the Blennerhassett Mansion on its original foundations. The mansion and island comprise Blennerhassett Island Historical State Park. In 1996, the bodies of Margaret and Harman Jr. were reburied on the island in an historical Episcopal ceremony.

== Publications ==
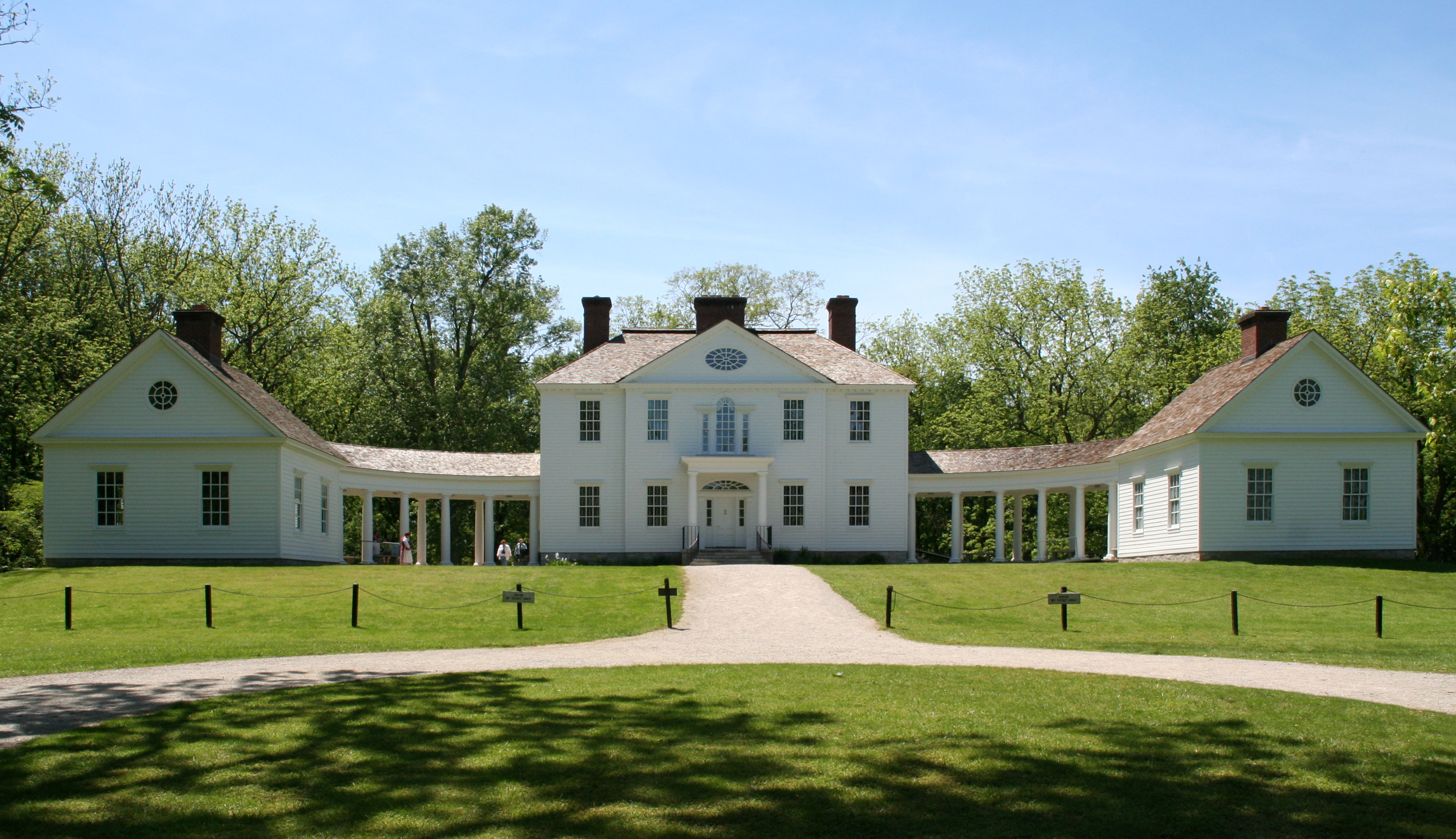
Replica of the mansion on Blennerhassett Island

Margaret is considered the first published poet from what is now West Virginia. While in Montreal, she published two collections of poetry, The Deserted Isle in 1822, and The Widow of the Rock and Other Poems in 1824. It was not common at the time for women to publish under their own names; that is why Margaret published under the pseudonym "A Lady". The first collection of poems she published, The Deserted Isle, referenced her beloved Island, now known as Blennerhassett Island.

Blennerhassett's life was also the subject of a 1901 novel, Blennerhassett; or, The Decrees of Fate, by Charles Felton Pidgin.

== See also ==
- Harman Blennerhassett
- Blennerhassett Island Historical State Park
