= Pine Grove, Pennsylvania =

Pine Grove, Pennsylvania may refer to more than one place:

- Pine Grove, Cambria County, Pennsylvania
- Pine Grove, Clearfield County, Pennsylvania
- Pine Grove, Lancaster County, Pennsylvania
- Pine Grove, Perry County, Pennsylvania
- Pine Grove, Schuylkill County, Pennsylvania
- Pine Grove, Susquehanna County, Pennsylvania
- Pine Grove, Venango County, Pennsylvania
- Pine Grove Township, Schuylkill County, Pennsylvania
- Pine Grove Township, Warren County, Pennsylvania
