= Busan International High School =

Coordinates: 35.16743°N 129.02337°E

Busan International High School 부산국제고등학교 / 釜山國際高等學校 / Busan-gukje-godeung-hakgyo
- Busanjin-gu, Busan; Korea, Republic of

Information
- Type: Public, Boarding school
- Motto: Eyes Towards the World, Hearts Full of Dreams (Nuneun segyero, gaseumeun huimangeul 눈은 세계로, 가슴은 희망을)
- Established: 1997
- Principal: Jung Kyung-soon (정경순)
- Faculty: 85
- Enrollment: 513
- Tree: Pine
- Flower: Camellia
- Website: school.busanedu.net/gukje-h/

Busan International High School (Korean: 부산국제고등학교; Hanja: 釜山國際高等學校; RR: BIHS) is a co-educational public high school located in Busan, South Korea specializing in the humanities and social science. BIHS opened in 1997 for the purpose of preparing students as experts in international relations. Schools for this purpose are called "International High Schools," and BIHS is one of them along with 6 other schools including Cheongshim International High School and Seoul International High School. These schools are classified as "Special Purpose High Schools" (특수목적고등학교).

Unlike Foreign Language High Schools, students at Busan International High School are not divided into classes based on what language they major in. Instead, they are distributed randomly into seven classes in each year, and select their second foreign language among Chinese, Japanese, Spanish, and French.

160 students are accepted annually. The 160 students are then divided into eight classes, which consist of roughly twenty students each. The school holds a joint program with Waseda University and Tsinghua University. In 2015, Busan International High School ranked ninth nationally among high schools in the Korean College Scholastic Ability Test (CSAT) results.
