= Gloucester (Natchez, Mississippi) =

Historic house in Mississippi, United States

- U.S. National Register of Historic Places
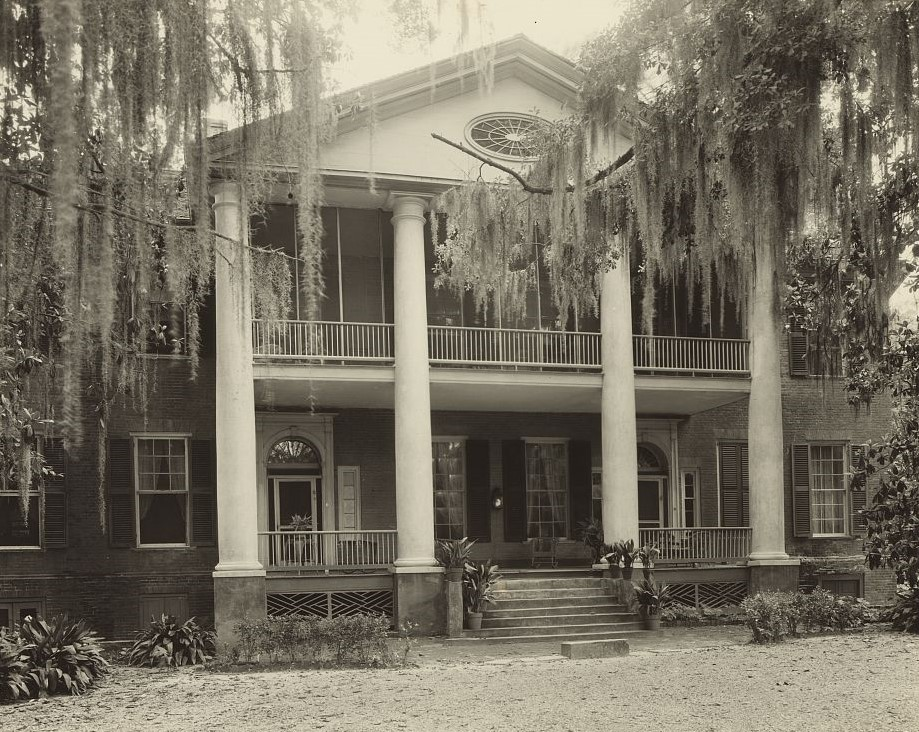
- Gloucester (Front/north), 1938

- Location within Mississippi Location within the United States
- Location: Natchez, Mississippi
- Coordinates: 31°31′54″N 91°24′7″W
- Area: 7.5 acres (3.0 ha)
- Built: 1803
- Architect: Levi Weeks
- Architectural style: Early Republic, Neo-classical
- NRHP reference No.: 76001085
- Added to NRHP: November 7, 1976

Gloucester is a historic mansion in Natchez, Mississippi. It is located on Lower Woodville Road in South Natchez. It was designed by local architect Levi Weeks and was listed on the National Register of Historic Places in 1976.

== History ==
Originally known as Bellevue, the mansion was built for David Williams in 1803. David Williams, according to census records of 1782, 1786 and 1792 was one of the wealthiest men in the country at the time. Bellevue was the centerpiece of a 5,000 acre plantation owned by David Williams adjacent to several thousand acres of cotton, tobacco and timber plantations that he owned. Later, the house was inherited by Maria McIntosh Williams, the wife of Winthrop Sargent (1753–1820), who served as the first Governor of the Mississippi Territory from 1798 to 1801. Sargent expanded the house and its gardens in 1808. It was then inherited by their son, George Washington Sargent, who was killed inside the house by Union forces in the American Civil War of 1861–1865.

== Architecture ==
It has two stories, with columns and a large portico on the front.

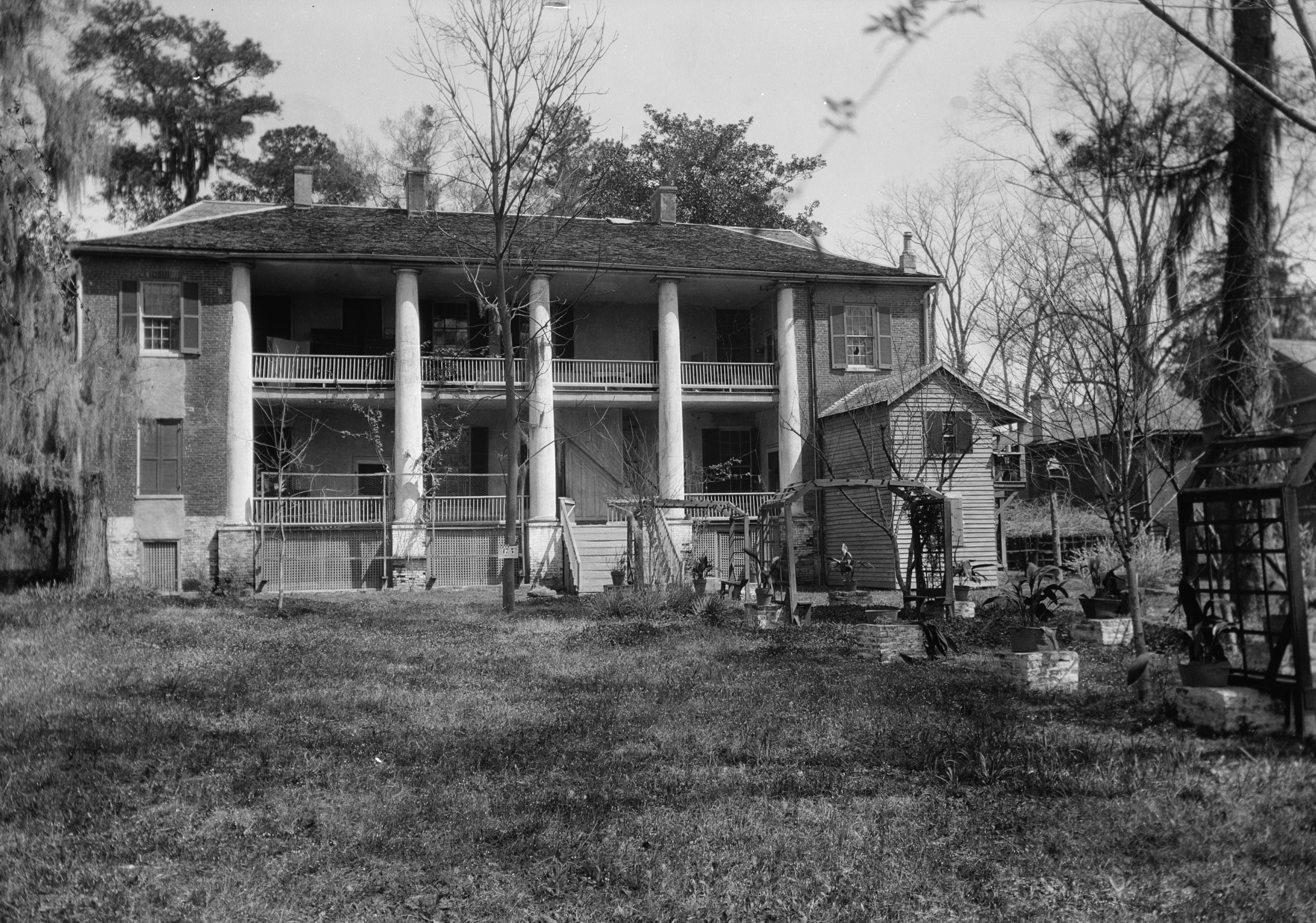
Rear/south, 1934
