= Harman Blennerhassett =

Anglo-Irish lawyer and plantation owner (1764–1831)

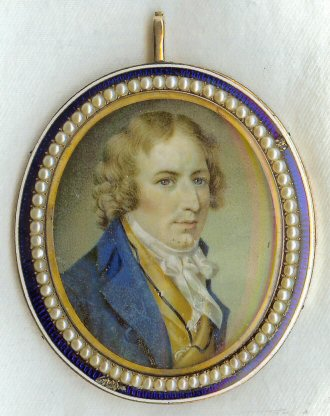
- Harman Blennerhassett, from a 1796 miniature painted in London
- Born: 8 October 1765; Hampshire, England, United Kingdom
- Died: 2 February 1831 (aged 65); Guernsey
- Occupation: Lawyer
- Known for: Blennerhassett Island
- Spouse: Margaret Agnew Blennerhassett
- Children: 6

Signature
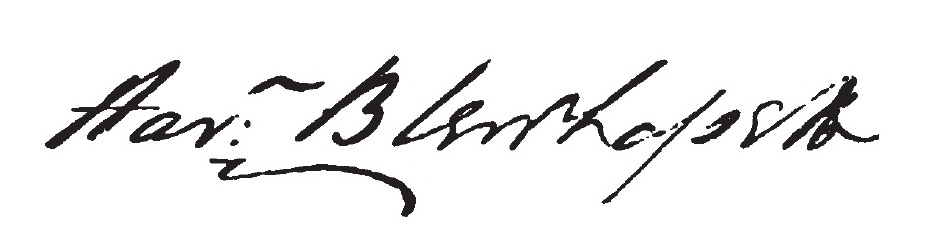

Harman Blennerhassett (8 October 1764 – 2 February 1831) was an Anglo-Irish lawyer, a member of the Society of United Irishmen who emigrated in advance of their rebellion in 1798 to become a socially and politically distinguished plantation owner in then-western Virginia. Implicated in the Burr conspiracy, an alleged military plot with Britain to separate the Louisiana Territory from the American Union, he was twice arrested and financially ruined. His last years were spent in England.

== Life ==
Harman Blennerhassett was born in Hampshire, England, to Conway Blennerhassett and his wife, Elizabeth Lacy. He was the grandson of Conway Blennerhassett and the great-great-grandson of Captain Robert Blennerhassett. At the age of two, Harman returned to the family's home in County Kerry, Ireland, a 7,000-acre estate called Castle Conway. As an adolescent, he was sent to Westminster School in London, and in 1784 entered the Middle Temple of London's famous Inns of Court. In 1790, he graduated from Trinity College, Dublin with a Bachelor of Laws, and started his practice at the Irish bar. Blennerhassett visited Paris in 1790; inherited the family estate in 1792; joined the secret Society of United Irishmen in 1793, which initially dedicated itself to reform, but later turned militantly radical; and in 1794 married Margaret Agnew, daughter of his sister Catherine and Major Robert Agnew, a career officer in the British army.

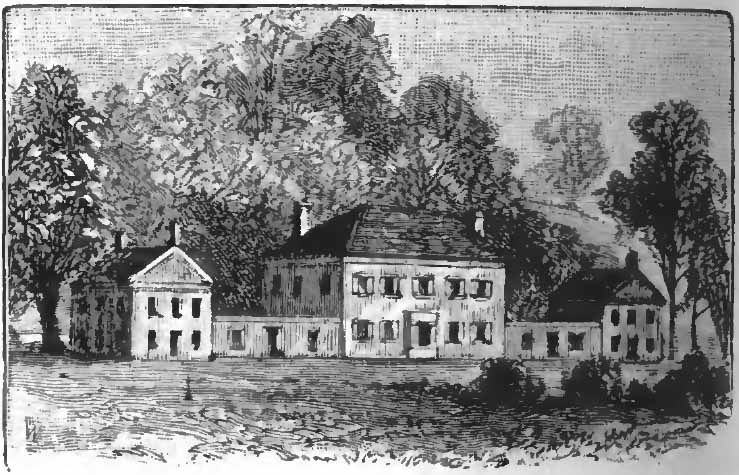
Blennerhassett's estate on a large island in the Ohio River, a few miles below Parkersburg, West Virginia

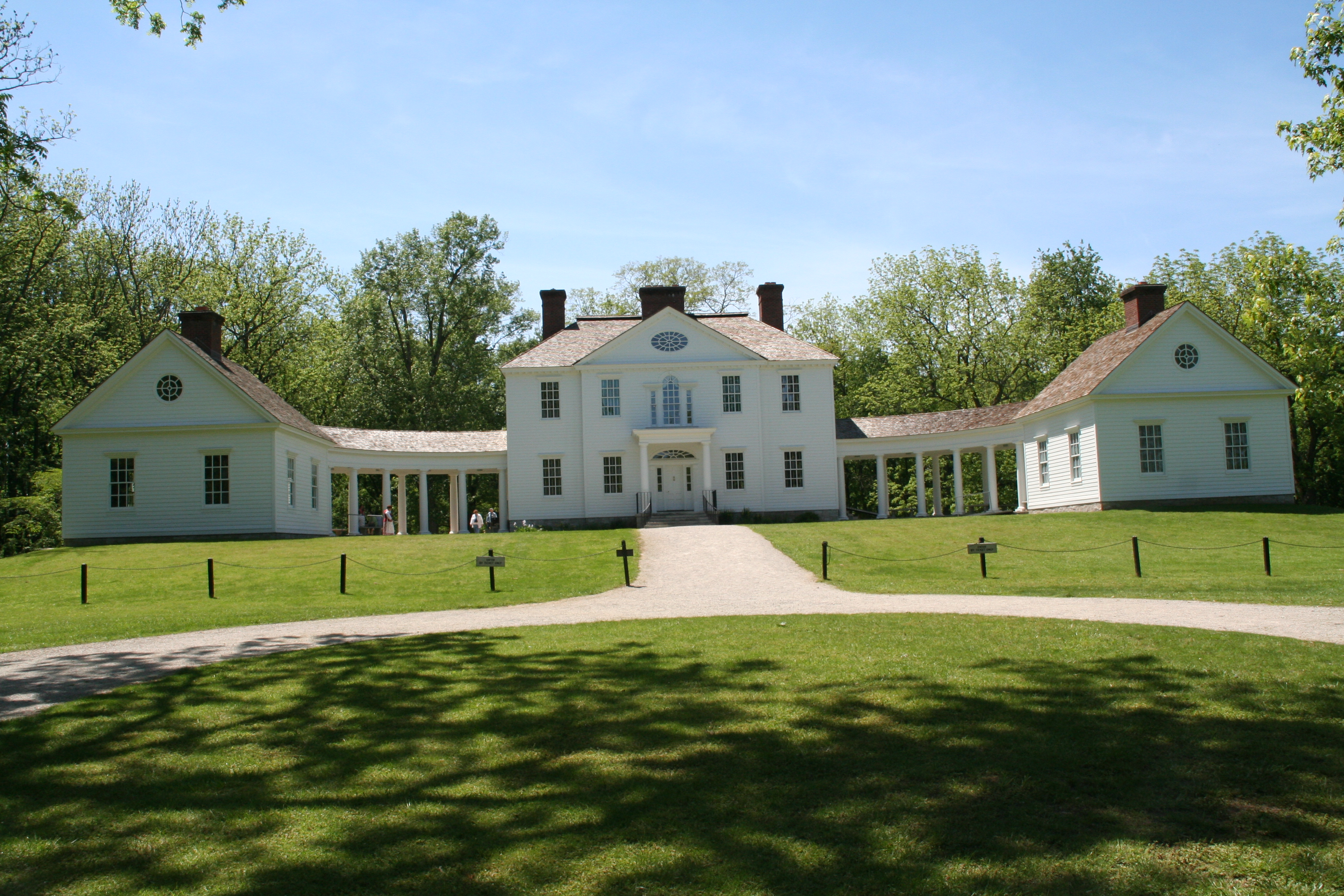
Blennerhassett's estate (reconstructed)

Blennerhassett coat of arms

Chiefly to escape involvement in the United Irishmen's planned rebellion against British rule, but also to conceal his incestuous marriage, Blennerhassett emigrated to the United States in 1796. There, on the western Virginia frontier, he bought the upper half of an Ohio River island lying 1.5 miles (2.4 km) downstream from what is now Parkersburg, West Virginia. It became the site of a European-style estate whose centrepiece was an enormous mansion surrounded by extravagantly landscaped lawns and gardens. For a brief period, the Blennerhassetts' home became famous as the largest, most beautiful private residence in the American West.

The most distinguished of the Blennerhassetts' many visitors was the former vice president of the United States, Aaron Burr. His three stays on the island resulted in its becoming headquarters for his mysterious 1806–1807 military expedition to the Southwest, an alleged scheme to separate the Louisiana Territory from the American union with the assistance of the British.

As the result of the president's call for the arrest of Burr, Blennerhassett, and their roughly 70 followers, the mansion and island were occupied and plundered in December 1806 by the local Virginia militia. Blennerhassett fled, was twice arrested, and finally imprisoned in the Virginia state penitentiary. He was only released following Burr's acquittal at the end of a long 1807 treason trial at Richmond, Virginia. The Blennerhassetts never returned to their island home, which in 1811 was destroyed by fire.

Now forced to earn a living for himself and family, Blennerhassett first settled on a cotton plantation near Port Gibson, Mississippi, where he lost what was left of his once large fortune. According to Emily Van Dorn Miller, daughter of P. A. Van Dorn, "Port Gibson is also noted as having been the home or hiding place ("La Cache") of Blennerhasset; not on the Mississippi River, as has been stated, but six or eight miles back of the town in the interior, surrounded by magnificent tall oaks and forest trees, a place once renowned for its beauty, comfort and hospitality."

Thereafter he unsuccessfully attempted to practice law in Montreal, Lower Canada (1819–1822), and eventually returned to Europe (1824). Here he initially lived with his family at Bath, England, but later relocated to the Channel Islands where he died in 1831. He was buried in Candie Cemetery, which had opened the same year.

The Blennerhassetts had six children: five biological, with three born on the island and two while in Mississippi, and one adopted. Of the biological children, three survived infancy, all sons.

The Blennerhassetts' island mansion was reconstructed 1984–1991 by the State of West Virginia, which now operates the site as a state park, Blennerhassett Island Historical State Park.

== See also ==
- Blennerhassett Island Historical State Park
- Margaret Agnew Blennerhassett
- Jonathan Thompson (lawyer)

== Sources ==
- Burke, Micheal. "A Chronicle of the Life of Harman Blennerhassett." West Virginia Historical Society Quarterly Vol. XIII, No. 1, January 1999. West Virginia Historical Society
- Swick, Ray. "Harman Blennerhassett: Irish Aristocrat and Frontier Entrepreneur." Essays In History. Volume 14, (1968–1969) The History Club Corcoran Department of History, University of Virginia, pp. 51–71.blennerhassett.net Accessed 6 September 2007
- Swick, Ray. "Aaron Burr's Visit to Blennerhassett Island", West Virginia History A Quarterly Vol. XXXV, No. 3, April 1974.
- Swick, Ray. An Island Called Eden: The Story of Harman and Margaret Blennerhassett (Parkersburg, West Virginia: Parkersburg Printing Company, 2000) Printed for Blennerhassett Island Historical State Park.
