= Brooklyn International High School =

Public school in New York City

Coordinates: 40.6974°N 73.9845°W

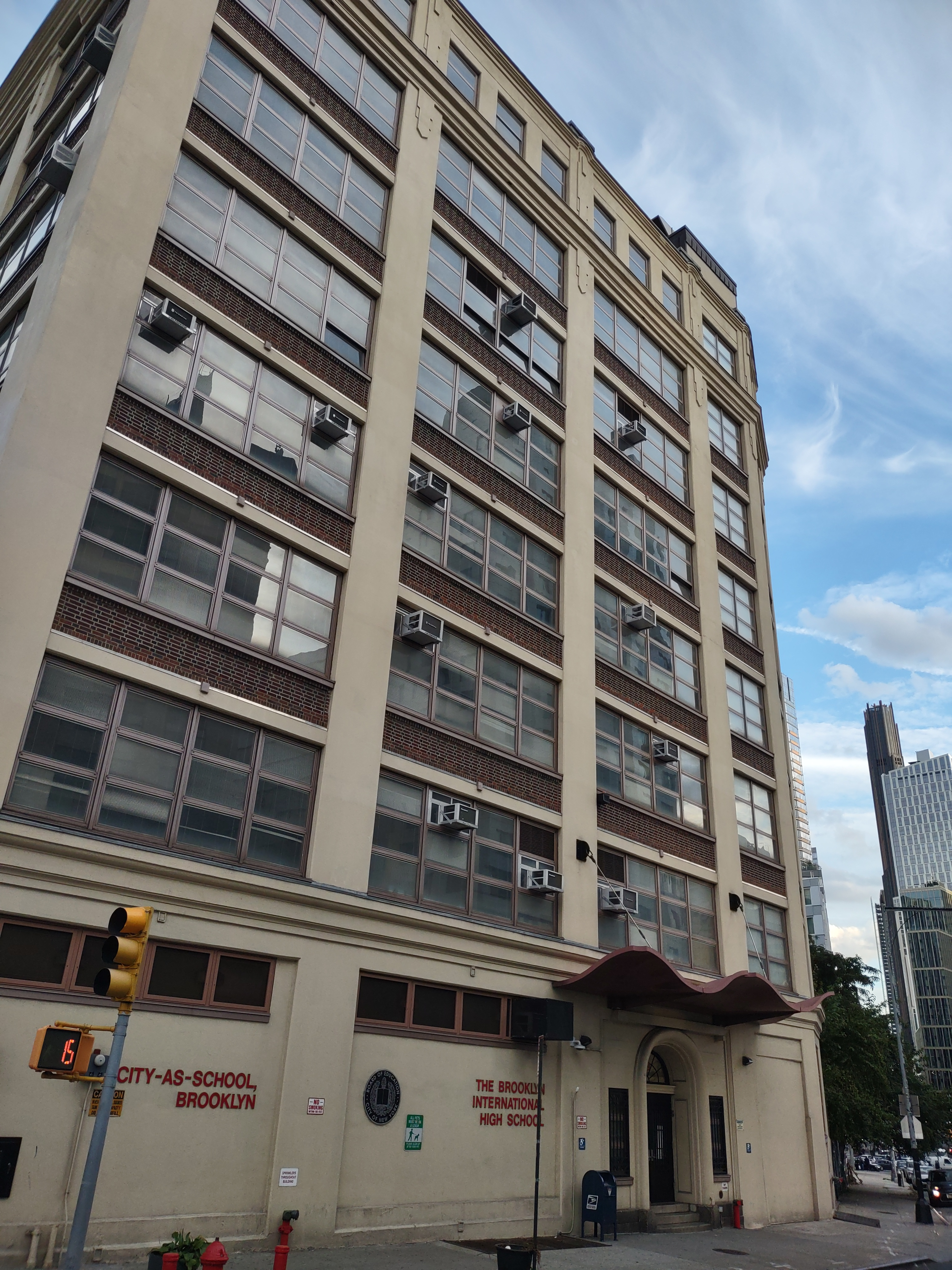

Information
- Established: 1994

Brooklyn International High School (BIHS, school code: K439) is a public high school in Brooklyn, New York City. It is a part of the New York City Department of Education (NYCDOE) and the Internationals Network for Public Schools.

The school is located within the Water’s Edge Educational Campus, a former torpedo factory in downtown Brooklyn. It shares its campus with the Science Skills Center and the Urban Assembly High School of Music and Art.

== History ==
BIHS was established in 1994 and focuses on the academic needs of English Language Learners from a diverse student body, largely from immigrants from a broad array of countries.

BIHS is a small public high school, notable for its multilingual model which has helped its largely immigrant and working class students achieve 91% graduation and 81% college acceptance rates, above the New York City averages as of 2016. It is also one of relatively few American public high schools with a formal cricket team; a program initiated by Bangladeshi and other students originally from countries where the originally British sport is popular.

In 2004, students protested that they were denied leave from school for Ramadan even though New York City Department of Education (NYCDOE) policy stated that students should have time off for religious activities. Students began a petition campaign to claim that right. The NYCDOE clarified that students do have the right to take leave for Ramadan purposes but only with parental permission, reflecting then-city wide Department of Education guidelines. In 2015, Eid al-Adha and Eid al-Fitr, the beginning and end of Ramadan respectively, were officially recognized as school holidays by the de Blasio administration. By 2016, the issue appears to have been fully resolved, with Ramadan observance now highlighted as part of the school's success, even notably observed by its cricket team.

As of 2023, attention on BIHS is largely driven by its academic achievements, non-standard testing programs, multicultural and multilingual model, emphases on participatory restorative justice programs, student-driven socially and technologically engaged projects, and college preparatory, tutoring, and placement initiatives.

== Demographics ==
In 2016 the school had 370 students from 41 countries, with some living in Brooklyn and some living in Queens. Each of the students have been located in the United States for fewer than four years, and the school does not admit persons who had been in the United States for longer than four years. As of 2023, 67% of students came from low-income backgrounds and 90% were multilingual learners.

== Instructional style ==
Each class has students of different demographics, including native language and prior background in formal education.

Students work in groups, across multiple grade levels, with teams of teachers, often translating each other's work both into English and into other students' native tongues as well.

== Athletics ==
Despite the school's cricket team, sports are relatively minor at BIHS compared with academic and community activities.

== See also ==
- International High School- Dataset
