= Burr conspiracy =

Alleged conspiracy to create a country led by Aaron Burr

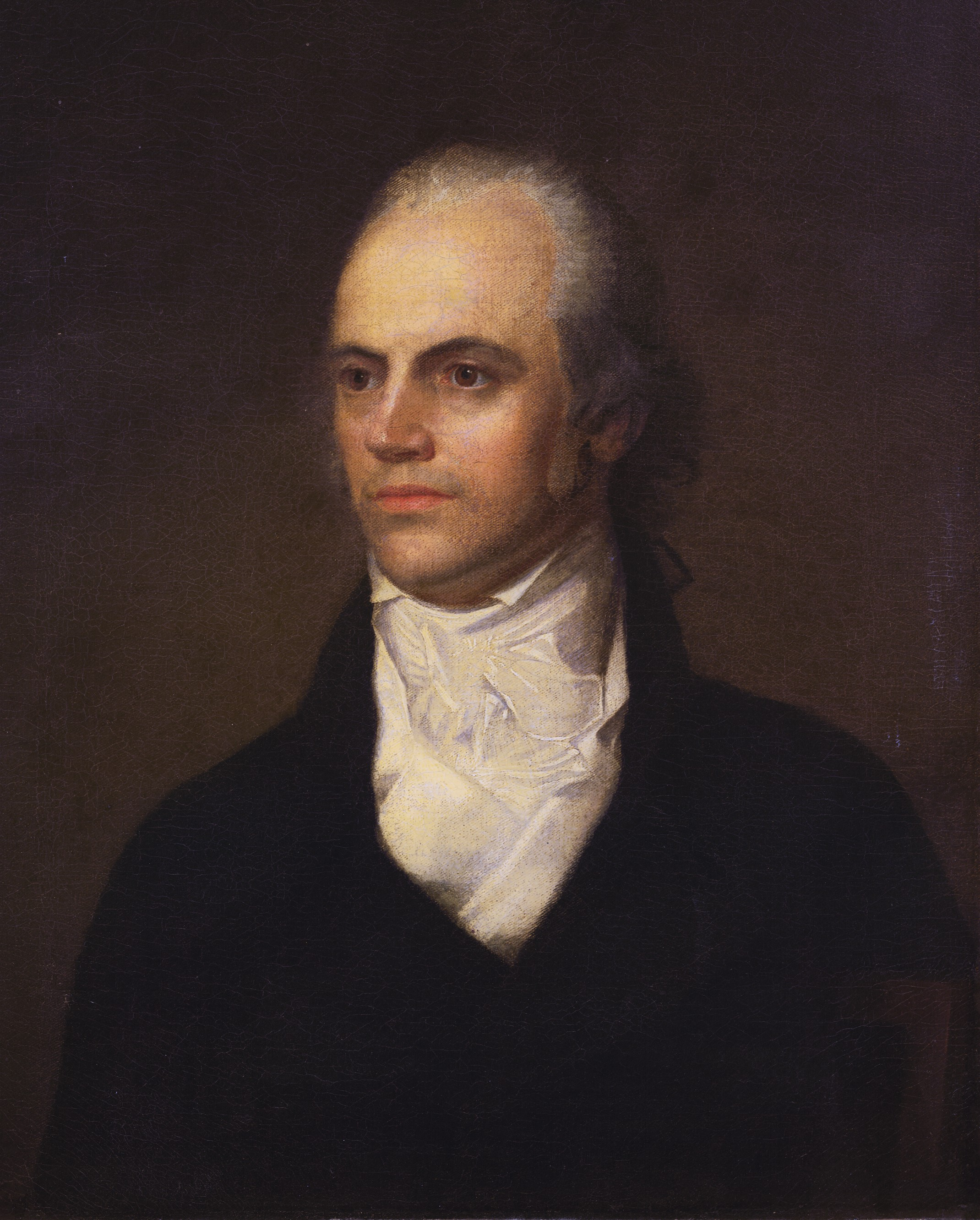
Portrait of Aaron Burr by John Vanderlyn

The Burr conspiracy of 1805–1807, was an alleged treasonous plot to have been planned by American politician and former military officer Aaron Burr (1756–1836), in the years during and after his single term as the third vice president of the United States (1801–1805), during the presidential administration and first term of the third president Thomas Jefferson (1743–1826, served 1801–1809).

Burr was accused of attempting to use his international connections and support from a cabal of American planters, politicians, and United States Army officers to establish an independent country in the old federal Southwest Territory (1790–1796), south of the Ohio River (future states of Kentucky, Tennessee and the future federal Territories of later Mississippi Territory (1798–1817), and adjacent Alabama Territory), and east of the Mississippi River and north of the southern coast along the Gulf of Mexico; or to invade/conquer the newly acquired Louisiana Purchase of 1803, west of the Mississippi River, later organized as the Louisiana Territory (1804–1812), then divided into the future 18th state of Louisiana and the upper/northern portion as the Missouri Territory (1812–1821); or plotting against the northern parts of the colonial New Spain (later Mexico), still held by Spain; or against and seizing the Florida peninsula of the longtime Royal Spanish colony of Spanish Florida (consisting of West Florida and East Florida), in the Americas/Western Hemisphere, part of the world-wide Spanish Empire since the early 16th century.

Burr's version was that he intended to farm 40,000 acres (160 km^{2}) in the Spanish Texas colonial province of the New Spain Viceroyalty which had been supposedly leased to him by the Spanish Crown.

In February 1807, former Vice President Burr was arrested on President Jefferson's orders and charged/indicted for treason, despite a lack of firm evidence. While Burr was ultimately acquitted of treason in a trial, due to the lack of detailed specificity in the 1787 text of the United States Constitution about any alleged crimes of treason, the fiasco and affair further destroyed his already faltering political career. Effigies of Burr were hanged and burned throughout the country and the threat of additional charges from individual states forced him into exile overseas in Europe.

Burr's true intentions remain unclear and, as a result, have led to varying theories from historians: some claim that he intended to take parts of Texas and the newly acquired Louisiana Purchase of 1803 for himself, while others believe he intended to try to conquer Mexico to the southwest (then a royal Spanish colonial province of the Kingdom of Spain in the Viceroyalty of New Spain, in the Americas, part of the world-wide Spanish Empire), or even as the gossip extended to wild accusations of conquering even the entirety of the continent of North America. The number of men backing him is also unclear, with wide-ranging different inconclusive accounts ranging from fewer than 40 men to upwards of 7,000.

== James Wilkinson ==
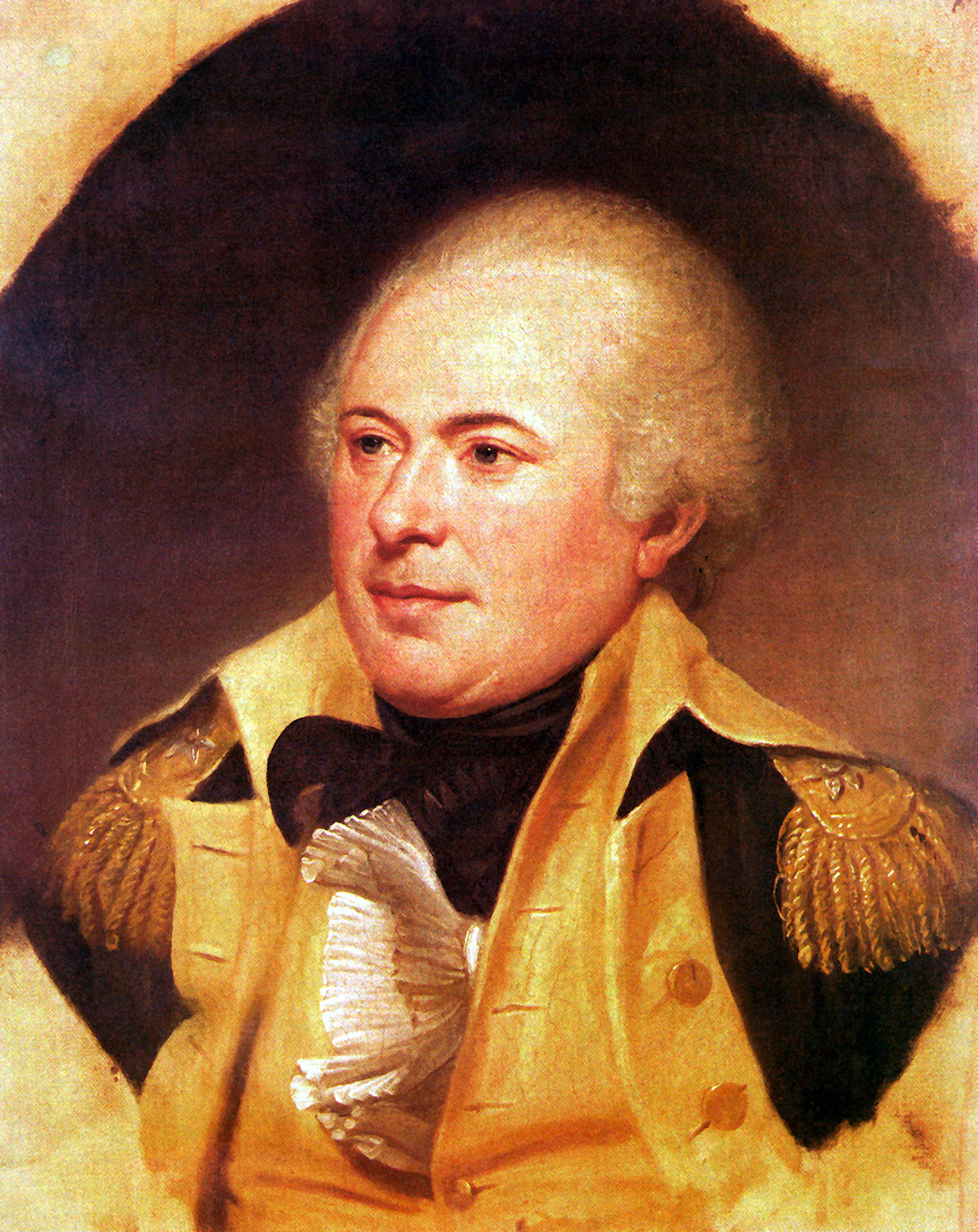
Brig. Gen. James Wilkinson

General James Wilkinson was one of Burr's key partners. The Commanding General of the United States Army at the time, Wilkinson was known for his attempt to separate Kentucky and Tennessee from the union during the 1780s. Burr persuaded President Thomas Jefferson to appoint Wilkinson to the position of Governor of the Louisiana Territory in 1805. Wilkinson would later send a letter to Jefferson that Wilkinson claimed was evidence of Burr's treason.

== Contacts with the British ==
While Burr was still vice president, in 1804 he met with Anthony Merry, the British Minister to the United States. As Burr told several of his colleagues, he suggested to Merry that the British might regain power in the Southwest if they contributed guns and money to his expedition. Merry wrote, "It is clear Mr. Burr... means to endeavour to be the instrument for effecting such a connection—he has told me that the inhabitants of Louisiana ... prefer having the protection and assistance of Great Britain." "Execution of their design is only delayed by the difficulty of obtaining previously an assurance of protection & assistance from some foreign power."

Thomas Jefferson was re-elected in 1804, but Burr was not nominated by the Democratic-Republicans to be Jefferson's running mate, and his term as vice president ended in March 1805. In November of that year, Burr again met with Merry and asked for two or three ships of the line and money. Merry informed Burr that London had not yet responded to Burr's plans which he had forwarded the previous year. Merry gave him fifteen hundred dollars. Those Merry worked for in London expressed no interest in furthering an American secession. In the spring of 1806, Burr had his final meeting with Merry. In this meeting Merry informed Burr that still no response had been received from London. Burr told Merry, "with or without such support it certainly would be made very shortly." Merry was recalled to Britain on June 1, 1806.

== Travels to the Ohio Valley and Louisiana Territory ==
In 1805, Burr wrote to the newly appointed judge to Louisiana Territory that he had amorphous plans to travel westward.

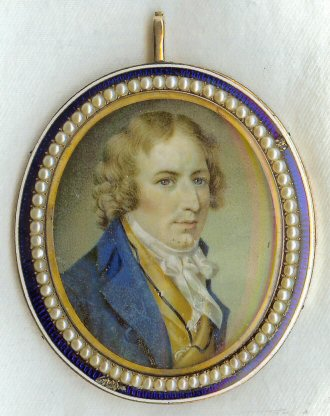
Harman Blennerhassett

That year Burr traveled from Pittsburgh, down the Ohio River, to the Louisiana Territory. He utilized the recently completed Louisville Canal, which allowed navigation past the Falls of the Ohio and facilitated travel to the western frontier. In the spring, Burr met with Harman Blennerhassett, who proved valuable in helping Burr further his plan. He provided friendship, support, and most importantly, access to Blennerhassett Island which he owned on the Ohio River, about 2 miles (3 km) below what is now Parkersburg, West Virginia.

On July 27, 1805, Burr stopped at a stand near the Duck River along the Natchez Trace to attend a party celebrating the signing of the Treaty of the Chickasaw Nation.

In 1806, Blennerhassett offered to provide Burr with substantial financial support. Burr and his co-conspirators used this island as a storage space for men and supplies. Burr tried to recruit volunteers to enter Spanish territories. In New Orleans, he met with the Mexican associates, a group of criollos whose objective was to conquer Mexico (still part of New Spain at the time). Burr was able to gain the support of New Orleans' Catholic bishop for his expedition into Mexico. By August 1805, the media was reporting on rumors of Burr's plans to raise a western army and "to form a separate government."

In early 1806, Burr contacted the Spanish diplomat and future Prime Minister, Carlos Martínez de Irujo y Tacón and told him that his plan was not just western secession, but the capture of Washington, D.C. Irujo wrote to his masters in Madrid about the coming "dismemberment of the colossal power which was growing at the very gates" of New Spain. Irujo allegedly gave Burr a few thousand dollars to commence his plan. The Spanish government in Madrid took no action.

Following the events in Kentucky, Burr returned to the West later in 1806 to recruit more volunteers for a military expedition down the Mississippi River. He began using Blennerhassett Island in the Ohio River to store men and supplies. The Governor of Ohio grew suspicious of the activity there, and ordered the state militia to raid the island and seize all supplies. Blennerhassett escaped with one boat, and he met Burr at the operation's headquarters on the Cumberland River. With a significantly smaller force, the two headed down the Ohio to the Mississippi River and New Orleans. Wilkinson had vowed to supply troops at New Orleans, but he concluded that the conspiracy was bound to fail, and rather than providing troops, Wilkinson revealed Burr's plan to President Jefferson.

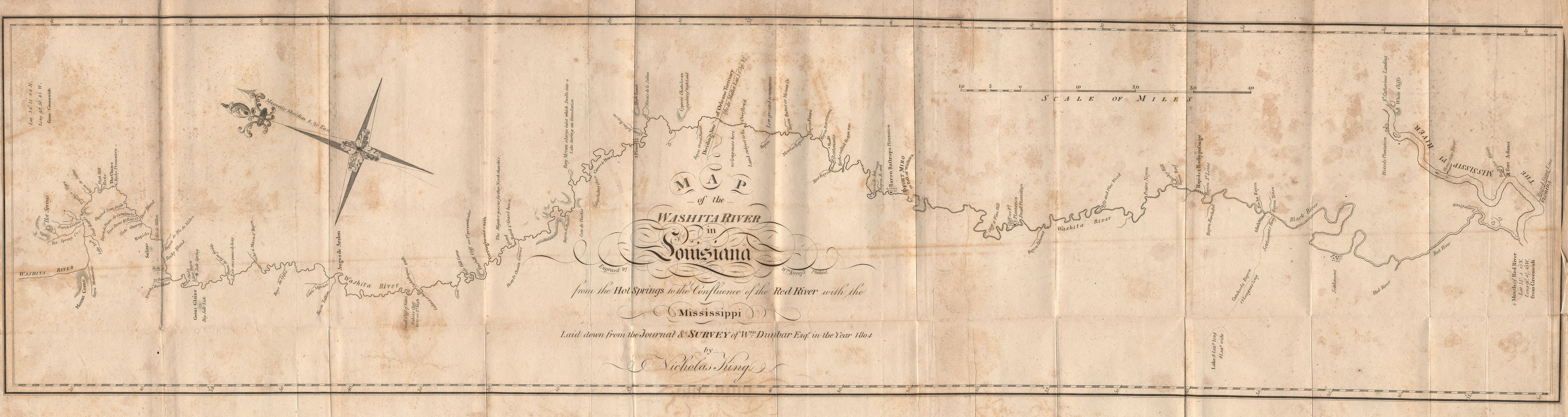
Map of the Washita (Ouachita) river in Louisiana from the Hot Springs to the confluence of the Red River with the Mississippi (LOC 2004633176)

== Arrest ==
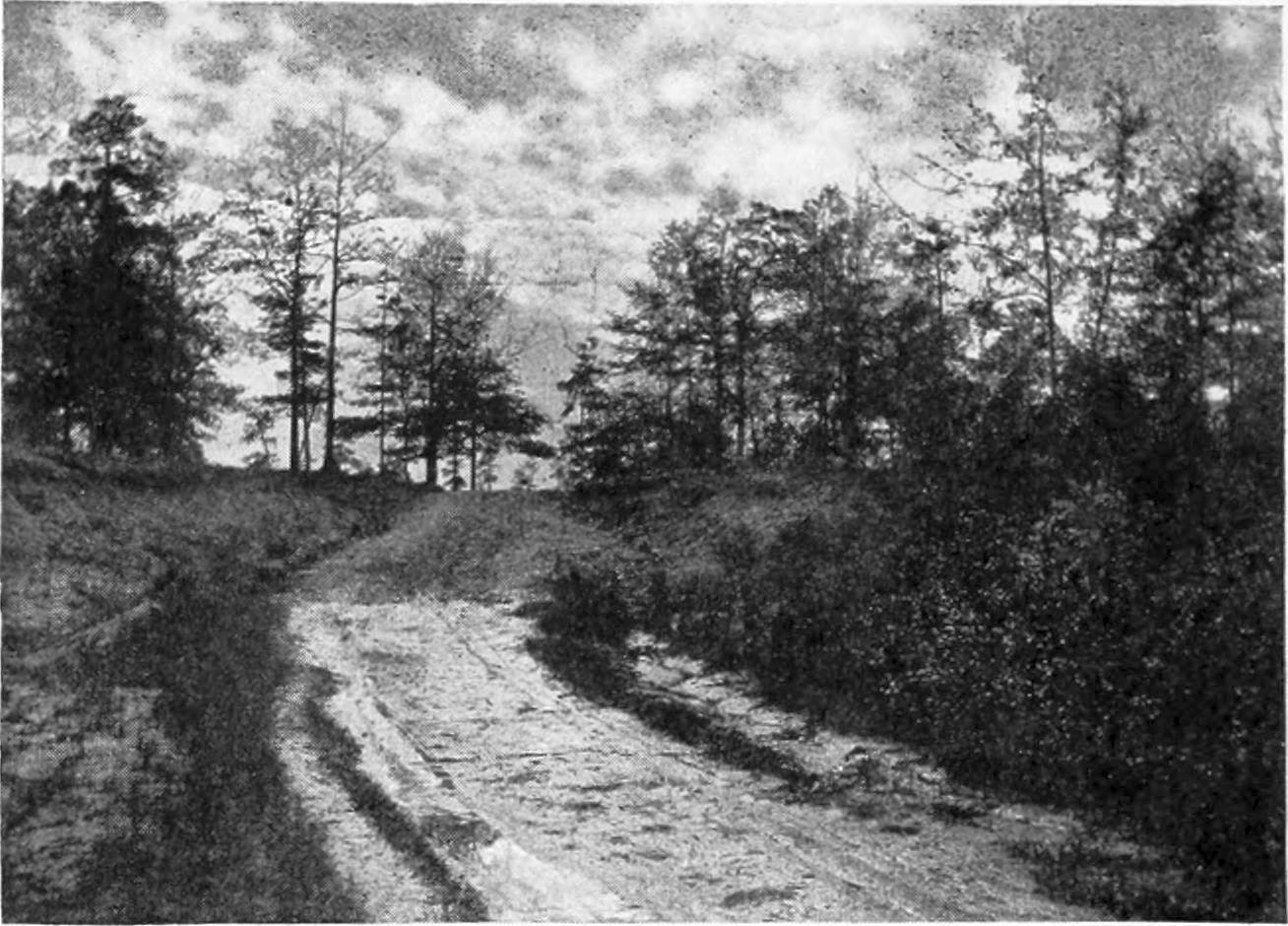
A photo from 1904 shows the place Burr was captured near Wakefield, Alabama

In February and March 1806, the federal attorney for Kentucky, Joseph Hamilton Daveiss, wrote Jefferson several letters warning him of Burr's plot. Daveiss also turned to the media for help warning about Burr's plan to provoke a rebellion in Spanish-held parts of the West, in order to join them to areas in the Southwest and form an independent nation under his rule. Jefferson dismissed Daveiss' accusations against Burr, a Democratic-Republican, as politically motivated.

Daveiss had Burr arrested, claiming that he intended to make war with Mexico. Burr was defended by the young attorney Henry Clay, and a federal jury declined to indict him.

By mid-1806, Jefferson and his cabinet began to take more notice of reports of political instability in the West. Their suspicions were confirmed when General Wilkinson sent the president correspondence which he had received from Burr. The text of the letter that was used as the principal evidence against Burr is as follows:

Yours postmarked 13th May is received. I have obtained funds, and have actually commenced the enterprise. Detachments from different points under different pretences will rendezvous on the Ohio, 1st November—everything internal and external favors views—protection of England is secured. T[ruxton] is gone to Jamaica to arrange with the admiral on that station, and will meet at the Mississippi—England—Navy of the United States are ready to join, and final orders are given to my friends and followers—it will be a host of choice spirits. Wilkinson shall be second to Burr only—Wilkinson shall dictate the rank and promotion of his officers. Burr will proceed westward 1st August, never to return: with him go his daughter—the husband will follow in October with a corps of worthies. Send forthwith an intelligent and confidential friend with whom Burr may confer. He shall return immediately with further interesting details—this is essential to concert and harmony of the movement. Send a list of all persons known to Wilkinson west of the mountains, who could be useful, with a note delineating their characters. By your messenger send me four or five of the commissions of your officers, which you can borrow under any pretence you please. They shall be returned faithfully. Already are orders to the contractor given to forward six months' provisions to points Wilkinson may name—this shall not be used until the last moment, and then under proper injunctions: the project is brought to the point so long desired: Burr guarantees the result with his life and honor—the lives, the honor and fortunes of hundreds, the best blood of our country. Burr's plan of operations is to move rapidly from the falls on the 15th of November, with the first five hundred or one thousand men, in light boats now constructing for that purpose—to be at Natchez between the 5th and 15th of December—then to meet Wilkinson—then to determine whether it will be expedient in the first instance to seize on or pass by Baton Rouge. On receipt of this send Burr an answer—draw on Burr for all expenses, &c. The people of the country to which we are going are prepared to receive us—their agents now with Burr say that if we will protect their religion, and will not subject them to a foreign power, that in three weeks all will be settled. The gods invite to glory and fortune—it remains to be seen whether we deserve the boon. The bearer of this goes express to you—he will hand a formal letter of introduction to you from Burr, a copy of which is hereunto subjoined. He is a man of inviolable honor and perfect discretion—formed to execute rather than project—capable of relating facts with fidelity, and incapable of relating them otherwise. He is thoroughly informed of the plans and intentions of Burr, and will disclose to you as far as you inquire, and no further—he has imbibed a reverence for your character, and may be embarrassed in your presence—put him at ease and he will satisfy you —29th July.

In an attempt to preserve his good name, Wilkinson edited the letters. They had been sent to him in cypher, and he altered the letters to testify to his own innocence and Burr's guilt. He warned Jefferson that Burr was "meditating the overthrow of [his] administration" and "conspiring against the State." Jefferson alerted Congress of the plan, and ordered the arrest of anyone who conspired to attack Spanish territory. He warned authorities in the West to be aware of suspicious activities. Convinced of Burr's guilt, Jefferson ordered his arrest.

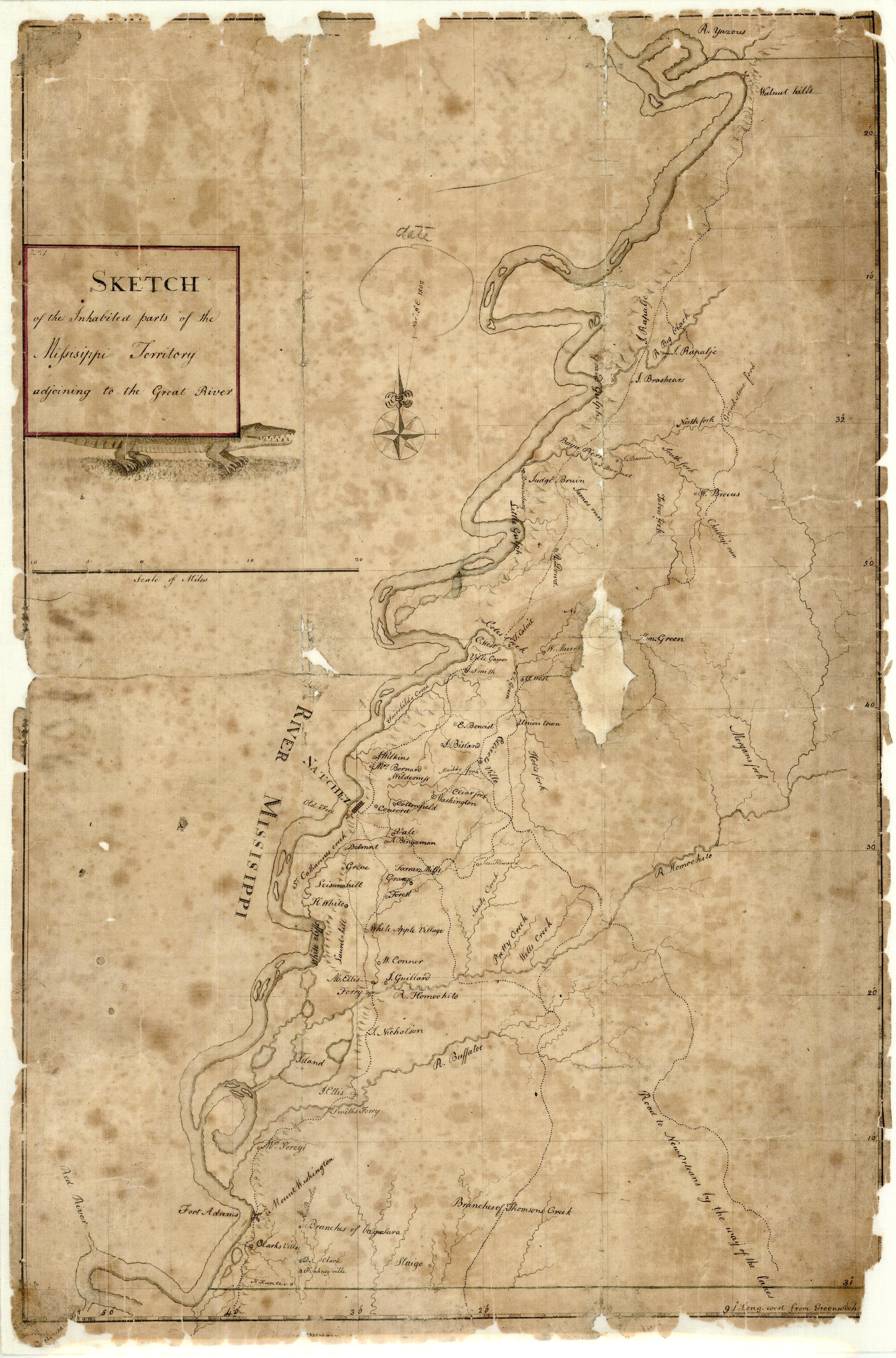
Burr initially turned himself in at Judge Bruin's on Bayou Pierre (U.S. survey of the Natchez District, 1802, NAID 191671882)

Burr continued his excursion down the Mississippi with Blennerhassett and the small army of men which they had recruited in Ohio. They intended to reach New Orleans, but in Bayou Pierre, 30 miles north of Natchez, they learned that a bounty was out for Burr's capture. Burr and his men surrendered at Bayou Pierre, and Burr was taken into custody. Charges were brought against him in the Mississippi Territory, but Burr escaped into the wilderness. He was recaptured on February 19, 1807, and was taken back to Virginia to stand trial.

== Trial ==
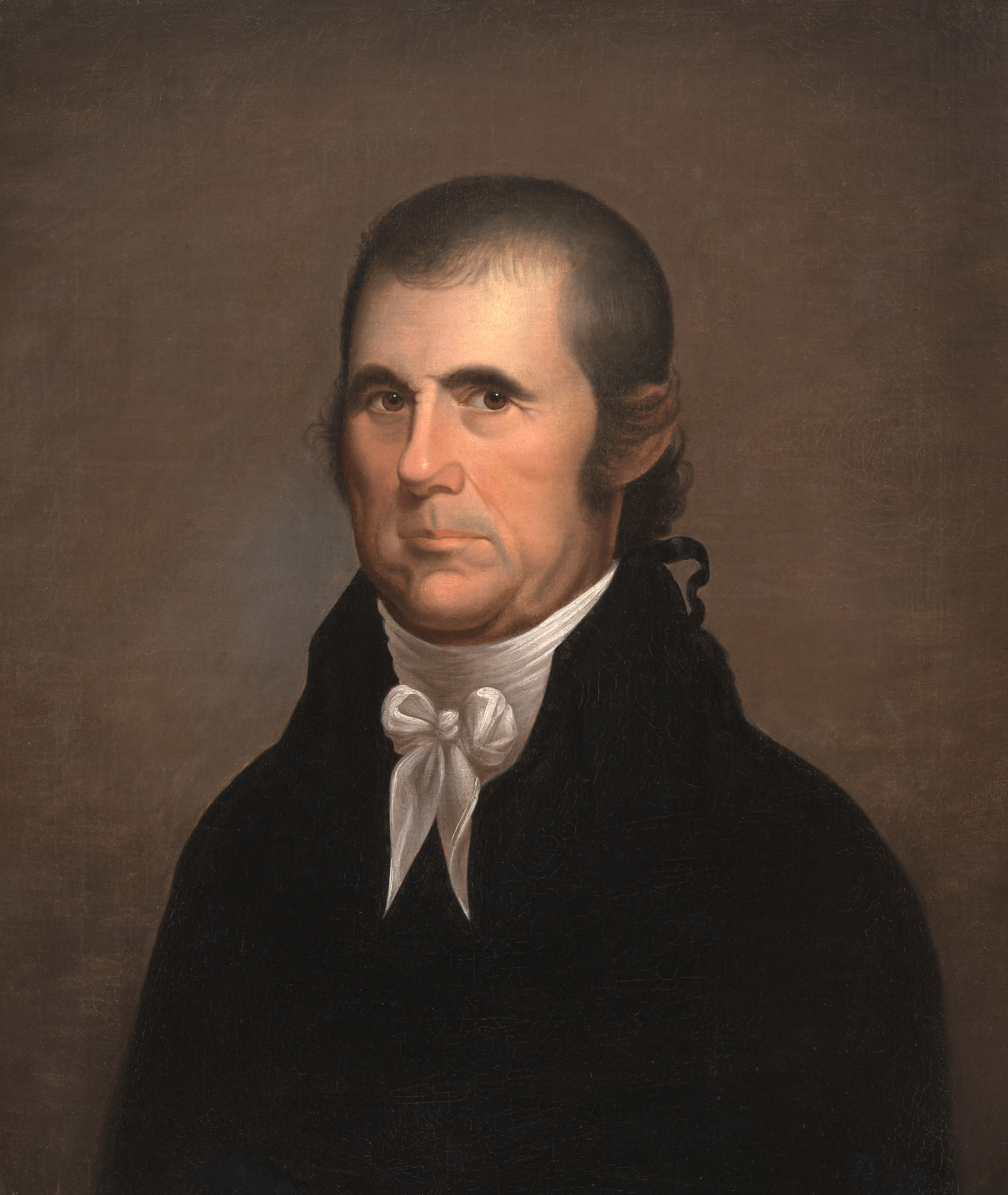
Chief Justice John Marshall presided over Burr's trial.

Burr was charged with treason because of the alleged conspiracy and stood trial in Richmond, Virginia. A Revolutionary War hero, U.S. Senator, New York State Attorney General and Assemblyman, and finally vice president under Jefferson, Burr adamantly denied and vehemently resented all charges against his honor, his character or his patriotism.

Burr was charged with treason for assembling an armed force to take New Orleans and separate the Western from the Atlantic states. He was also charged with high misdemeanor for sending a military expedition against territories belonging to Spain. George Hay, the prosecuting U.S. Attorney, compiled a list of over 140 witnesses, one of whom was Andrew Jackson, who previously invited Burr to stay at his house when he was on the run. To encourage witnesses to cooperate with the prosecution, Thomas Jefferson gave Hay blank pardons containing Jefferson's signature and the discretion to issue them to all but "the grossest offenders"; Jefferson later amended these instructions to include even those the prosecution believed to be most culpable, if that meant the difference in convicting Burr.

Burr's trial brought into question the ideas of executive privilege, state secrets privilege, and the independence of the executive. Burr's lawyers, including John Wickham, asked Chief Justice John Marshall to subpoena Jefferson, claiming that they needed documents from Jefferson to present their case accurately. Jefferson proclaimed that, as president, he was "Reserving the necessary right of the President of the U S to decide, independently of all other authority, what papers, coming to him as President, the public interests permit to be communicated, & to whom." He insisted that all relevant papers had been made available, and that he was not subject to this writ because he held executive privilege. He also argued that he should not be subject to the commands of the judiciary, because the Constitution guaranteed the executive branch's independence from the judicial branch. Marshall decided that the subpoena could be issued despite Jefferson's position of presidency. Though Marshall vowed to consider Jefferson's office and avoid "vexatious and unnecessary subpoenas", his ruling was significant because it suggested that, like all citizens, the president was subject to the law.

Chief Justice Marshall had to consider the definition of treason and whether intent was sufficient for conviction, rather than action. Marshall ruled that because Burr had not committed an act of war, he could not be found guilty (see Ex parte Bollman); the First Amendment guaranteed Burr the right to voice opposition to the government. To merely suggest war or to engage in a conspiracy was not enough. To be convicted of treason, Marshall ruled, an overt act of participation must be proven with evidence. Intention to divide the union was not an overt act: "There must be an actual assembling of men for the treasonable purpose, to constitute a levying of war." Marshall further supported his decision by indicating that the Constitution stated that two witnesses must see the same overt act against the country. Marshall narrowly construed the definition of treason provided in Article III of the Constitution; he noted that the prosecution had failed to prove that Burr had committed an "overt act" as the Constitution required. As a result, the jury acquitted the defendant.

Witness testimony was inconsistent, and one of the few witnesses to testify to an "overt act of treason", Jacob Allbright, perjured himself in the process. Allbright testified that militia General Edward Tupper raided Blennerhasset Island and attempted to arrest Harman Blennerhasset, but had been stopped by armed followers of Burr, who raised their weapons at Tupper to threaten him. In fact, Tupper had previously provided a deposition stating that when he visited the island, he had no arrest warrant, had not attempted to effect an arrest of anyone, had not been threatened, and had a pleasant visit with Blennerhasset.

The historians Nancy Isenberg and Andrew Burstein write that Burr "was not guilty of treason, nor was he ever convicted, because there was no evidence, not one credible piece of testimony, and the star witness for the prosecution had to admit that he had doctored a letter implicating Burr." In contrast, lawyer and author David O. Stewart concludes that Burr's intention included "acts that constituted the crime of treason, but that in the context of 1806, "the moral verdict is less clear." He points out that neither invasion of Spanish lands nor secession of American territory was considered treasonous by most Americans at the time, in view of the fluid boundaries of the American Southwest at that time, combined with the widespread expectation (shared by President Jefferson) that the United States might well divide into two nations.

== Aftermath ==
Supreme Court Justice John Marshall's performance during the trial was closely monitored by Jefferson, who would have called for his impeachment had he been too hostile towards him or partial to Burr. While no impeachment was made, it was enough to cause two amendments to be brought up from some members of Congress, which would have allowed federal judges to be removed without relying on the impeachment process. Both of these amendments gained little support once proposed, so neither was approved.

Wilkinson's alteration of Burr's letter was clearly intended to minimize Wilkinson's culpability. His forgery and obviously self-serving testimony made Burr seem to be the victim of an overzealous government. The grand jury nearly produced enough votes in favor of indicting Wilkinson for misprision of treason. The foreman, John Randolph said of Wilkinson that he was a "mammoth of iniquity", the "most finished scoundrel", and "the only man I ever saw who was from the bark to the very core a villain."

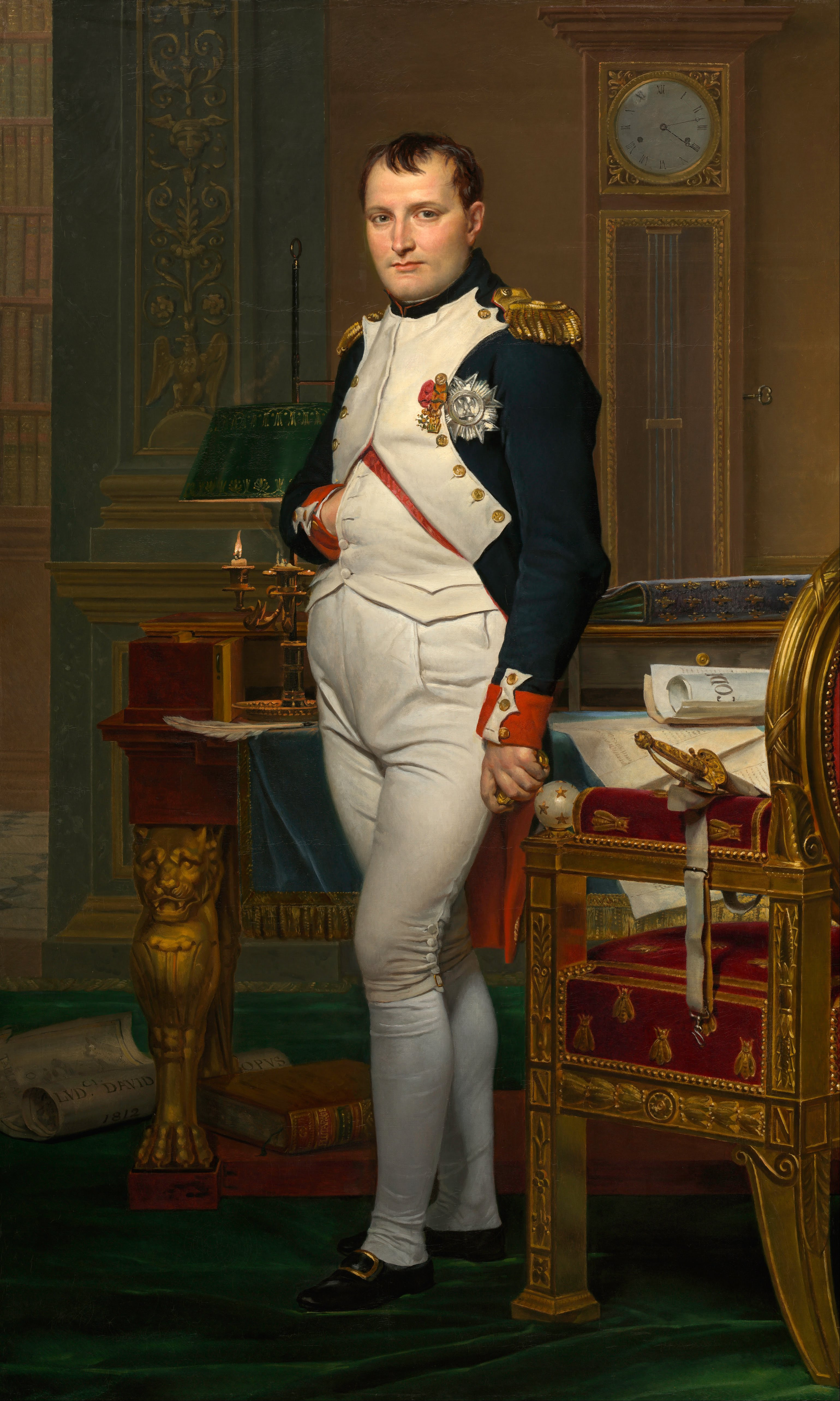
Napoleon Bonaparte, the Emperor of France during Burr's time in Europe

Blennerhassett's mansion and island had been occupied by the Virginia militia, which allegedly plundered the property. Blennerhassett fled with his family, was arrested twice, and remained in prison until Burr's acquittal. Afterward he moved to Mississippi to become a cotton planter. Later in life, he and his family moved to Montreal, Canada. Towards the end of his life, he went to Europe, where he lived until his death in Guernsey on February 2, 1831.

Though victorious in court, Burr lost in the court of public opinion. The United States government was broadly supportive of expansion and was even known to pointedly ignore military filibuster conspiracies in the southwest for reasons diplomatic and pragmatic, but Burr was uniquely viewed as not just expansionist but secessionist. Effigies of him, the other conspirators, and Marshall were hanged all across the nation. Burr also was found in violation of the Neutrality Act, which in addition to the public outcry towards his acquittal, caused him to enter a self-imposed exile in Europe for protection. While there, Burr attempted to start a revolution in Mexico with help from England, which was denied. He went to France next, and reached out to Napoleon directly, but was also denied assistance. Defeated, Burr returned to the United States after four years overseas under the alias of M. Arnot. He resumed his law practice in New York until his death on September 14, 1836.

== Legacy ==
Andrew Jackson's early affiliation with Burr followed him for the next 40 years. In 1842, a "Justitia" writing in the New-York American connected the Burr conspiracy and Jackson's association with Sam Houston, writing:

"I will now say in general terms, that the committee that undertook the defense of Gen. Jackson, at the period of his first nomination for the presidency, against the charge that he was a participator in Burr's conspiracy, do not even pretend to clear him of that part of it relating to the conquest of Mexico, but only of what relates to the dismemberment of this Union. And had they thus attempted, Jackson's own declaration would have tended to confute them: for, in a letter of his to Gov. Claiborne, of Louisiana, dated Nov. 12, 1806, he says: "I hate the Dons; I WOULD DELIGHT TO SEE MEXICO REDUCED." Still more effectually would his acts have confuted them. He was an agent of Burr; he received money from him to conduct his agency; he built boats for him; obtained for him stores and provisions; was on the most intimate terms with him; and, long after the explosion of Burr's schemes, whatever they might have been, continued still so much in his good graces, as to be his favorite candidate for the presidency of the United States! So, likewise, in relation to Gen. Houston, the recent conspirator against Mexico. Gen. Jackson was fully aware of all his movements in getting up his Texan expedition; notwithstanding which, he entertained him in the most cordial manner, as he had previously done to Burr; and instead of adopting measures to check his operations, countenanced him in every way he could, as far as he dared to do, under existing circumstances. Whence this coincidence? How happened it, that the two arch-conspirators against the integrity of the Mexican republic, should, at different and distant periods, make Jackson's domicil their rendezvous? Because, to use his own words, "he hated the Dons, and would delight to see Mexico reduced."

== Primary sources ==
- "Aaron Burr and the Definition of Treason (1783–1815)." American Eras. 8 vols. Gale Research, 1997–1998. Student Resource Center. Thomson Gale.
- "The Aaron Burr Conspiracy (1800–1860)." American Eras. 8 vols. Gale Research, 1997–1998. Student Resource Center. Thomson Gale.
- American State Papers, 9th Congress, 2nd Session
  - Miscellaneous: Volume 1, 468 pp, No. 217. Burr's Conspiracy.
  - Miscellaneous: Volume 1, 478 pp, No. 223. Burr's Conspiracy – his arrest.
- "Burr's Conspiracy, 1805–1807." DISCovering U.S. History. Online Edition. Gale, 2003. Student Resource Center. Thomson Gale.
- United States v. Burr, 25 Fed. Cas. 30 (C.C.D. Va. 1807) (Opinion of Marshall, C.J.)
