= Misdemeanor (disambiguation) =

A misdemeanor is a "lesser" criminal act.

Misdemeanor may also refer to:

- High misdemeanor, an archaic term in English Law for a number of positive misprisions, neglects and contempts

== Music ==
- Misdemeanor (UFO album), 1985
- Misdemeanor (band), a female stoner rock band from Sweden
  - Misdemeanor, a 2002 album by the band
- "Miss Demeanor", a song by Sweet on their album, Desolation Boulevard
- Missy "Misdemeanor" Elliott, a female American rapper
- "Misdemeanor" (song), 1973 single by Foster Sylvers

== See also ==
- Miss Demeanor, a character in Ninjago
- Ms. Demeanor, a cartoon character in the COPS animated TV series
- High crimes and misdemeanours, allegations of misconduct that do not fall under a more clearly defined impeachable offence
