= Crimes and misdemeanors =

Crimes and misdemeanors (or misdemeanours) may refer to:

- Crimes and Misdemeanors, 1989 film by Woody Allen
- High crimes and misdemeanours, a judicial term
