= Andrew Burstein =

American historian

- Born: June 16, 1952 (age 74)
- Known for: Books on Thomas Jefferson and early American political culture
- Spouse: Nancy Isenberg

Academic background
- Education: Columbia University (B.A.); University of Michigan (M.A.); University of Virginia (Ph.D.)

Academic work
- Institutions: Louisiana State University (emeritus); University of Tulsa

Andrew Burstein (born June 16, 1952) is an American historian. He is the Charles P. Manship Professor of History emeritus at Louisiana State University and has written extensively on Thomas Jefferson, the early presidency, and the political culture of the early American republic.

== Early life and education ==
Burstein attended the Hackley School in Tarrytown, New York. He received a B.A. in Oriental Studies from Columbia University in 1974 and an M.A. from the Center for Chinese Studies at the University of Michigan in 1975. For roughly fifteen years afterward he worked in the China trade, first for a Wall Street import firm and later as an independent consultant. He completed a Ph.D. in American history at the University of Virginia in 1994.

== Career ==
Burstein taught first as an assistant professor at the University of Northern Iowa. He later held the Mary Frances Barnard Chair in Nineteenth-Century American History at the University of Tulsa. In 2008 he moved to Louisiana State University as the Charles P. Manship Professor of History; he is now emeritus. While at LSU he also edited the Southern Biography series published by LSU Press.

He has served on the Advisory Board of the Papers of Thomas Jefferson. He appeared as a consultant on Ken Burns’s PBS documentary Thomas Jefferson and has been interviewed on C-SPAN’s American Presidents series and Booknotes.

== Books ==
Burstein has published more than a dozen books on early American political culture, many focused on Thomas Jefferson, Andrew Jackson, and the Adams family. He has frequently collaborated with his wife, historian Nancy Isenberg.

Among his earlier works, Sentimental Democracy: The Evolution of America's Romantic Self-Image (Hill and Wang, 1999) examines how the language of sentiment and sensibility shaped American political discourse from the Revolutionary era through the rise of Andrew Jackson. Drawing on letters, speeches, newspapers, and popular literature, Burstein traces the shift from an idealized "man of feeling" to a more competitive, masculine political style. The book was reviewed in The American Historical Review by Ronald J. Zboray, who discussed its contribution to understanding national character and emotional culture in the early republic. Gordon S. Wood also reviewed it in The New York Review of Books, placing the work in the broader context of American emotional and political self-image.

The Passions of Andrew Jackson (Knopf, 2003) offers a critical portrait of the seventh president, emphasizing Jackson's volatile temperament, sense of honor, and frontier experiences. Richard Brookhiser reviewed the book in The New York Times, describing it as a study that raises questions about democracy itself while examining Jackson's drive to prevail. Arthur Schlesinger Jr. discussed it in The New York Review of Books, noting Burstein's research into Jackson's early life and his portrayal of the president as a complex, often unflattering figure.

Other books include The Inner Jefferson: Portrait of a Grieving Optimist (University of Virginia Press, 1995), America's Jubilee (Knopf, 2001), Jefferson's Secrets (Basic Books, 2005), The Original Knickerbocker: The Life of Washington Irving (Basic Books, 2007), Madison and Jefferson (Random House, 2010; with Nancy Isenberg), Democracy's Muse (University of Virginia Press, 2015), The Problem of Democracy (Viking, 2019; with Nancy Isenberg), and Longing for Connection (Johns Hopkins University Press, 2024). Reviews of his work have appeared in The New York Times, The Washington Post, The New Republic, the Times Literary Supplement, and academic journals including the William and Mary Quarterly and Journal of American History.

He has also written for The New York Times, The Washington Post, and Salon.

== Personal life ==
Burstein is married to the historian Nancy Isenberg, who holds the T. Harry Williams Professorship at Louisiana State University. They have co-authored several books. He lives in Charlottesville, Virginia.
