= Nancy Isenberg =

American historian

- Spouse: Andrew Burstein

Academic background
- Education: Rutgers University, University of Wisconsin–Madison

Academic work
- Discipline: History
- Institutions: Louisiana State University
- Notable works: White Trash: The 400-Year Untold History of Class in America

Nancy G. Isenberg (born 1958) is an American historian and T. Harry Williams Professor of History Emerita at Louisiana State University.

== Life ==
She graduated from Rutgers University and University of Wisconsin. In 2017, she published the book White Trash: The 400-Year Untold History of Class in America.

== Awards ==
- 1999, Society for Historians of the Early American Republic (SHEAR) book prize for Sex and Citizenship in Antebellum America
- 2003, First Union International Fellowship, International Center for Jefferson Studies
- 2003-2004 and 2007–2008, Kate B. and Hall J. Peterson Fellowship, American Antiquarian Society
- 2008, Award for best non-fiction book for Fallen Founder, Oklahoma Center for the Book
- 2008, Finalist for the Los Angeles Times Book Prize in Biography
- 2016, shared with Lyra Monteiro, Walter & Lillian Lowenfels Criticism Award, Before Columbus Foundation
- 2016, #4 on Politico Magazine's Annual List of the “50 Most important Thinkers”
- 2017, LSU Distinguished Research Master Award
- 2017, Finalist for the J. Anthony Lukas Book Prize, Columbia School of Journalism and Nieman Foundation at Harvard University
- 2017, PEN Oakland Josephine Miles Award for White Trash

== Works ==
- Sex and Citizenship in Antebellum America. Univ of North Carolina Press. 9 November 2000. ISBN 978-0-8078-6683-2.
- Fallen Founder: The Life of Aaron Burr. Viking. 2007. ISBN 978-0-670-06352-9.
- Nancy Isenberg; Andrew Burstein (5 July 2012). Mortal Remains: Death in Early America. University of Pennsylvania Press. ISBN 978-0-8122-0806-1.
- Andrew Burstein; Nancy Isenberg (15 January 2013). Madison and Jefferson. Random House Publishing Group. ISBN 978-0-8129-7900-8.
- White Trash: The 400-Year Untold History of Class in America. Penguin Publishing Group. 21 June 2016. ISBN 978-1-101-60848-7.
- Andrew Burstein; Nancy Isenberg (2019). The Problem of Democracy: The Presidents Adams Confront the Cult of Personality. Viking. ISBN 978-0-5255-5750-0.
- Aristocracy, American Style: Class Privilege and the Persistence of Elite Power. Viking. 2026. ISBN 978-0-593-49404-2.
