= High misdemeanor =

Archaic term in English Law

"High misdemeanor" is an archaic term in English law for a number of positive misprisions, neglects and contempts. Despite being considered serious offences they were subject to the criminal procedure applicable to other misdemeanors, rather than those for felony or treason (distinctions abolished in 1967 and 1945 respectively). The most important example may be that of maladministration in high office.

== Examples in English law ==
A number of United Kingdom statutes refer to particular crimes as being high misdemeanors:

- Discharging or aiming firearms, or throwing or using any offensive matter or weapon, with intent to injure or alarm the Sovereign
- Where a Roman Catholic advises the Crown on the appointment to offices of the Established Church
- Where a Jew advises the Crown on the appointment to offices of the Churches of England, Ireland and Scotland

Blackstone describes a number of offences as being high misdemeanors, for example:

- treasonable words
- receiving stolen goods
- prison break
- maladministration of high office
- firing of (i.e. setting fire to) one's house in a town

A number of statutory references to high misdemeanors have subsequently been repealed, including:

- The conviction of a returning officer for corrupt practices during an election to the Parliament of Ireland

== See also ==
- High crimes and misdemeanours

== Notes ==
- Section 2, Treason Act 1842
- Section 18, Roman Catholic Relief Act 1829
- Section 4, Jews Relief Act 1858
- Section 25, Parliamentary Elections (Ireland) Act 1820 and Section 75, Parliamentary Elections (Ireland) Act 1823
