= High crimes and misdemeanors =

Legal term

The charge of high crimes and misdemeanors covers allegations of misconduct by officials. Offenses by officials also include ordinary crimes, but perhaps with different standards of proof and punishment than for non-officials, on the grounds that more is expected of officials by their oaths of office.

== United Kingdom ==
The impeachment of the King's Chancellor, Michael de la Pole, 1st Earl of Suffolk, in 1386 was the first case to use this charge. One charge under this heading alleged that de la Pole broke a promise to Parliament to follow the advice of a committee regarding improvement of the kingdom. Another charge said that because he failed to pay a ransom for Ghent, the city fell to the French.

The 1450 impeachment of William de la Pole, 1st Duke of Suffolk, a descendant of Michael, was the next to allege charges under this title. He was charged with using his influence to obstruct justice as well as cronyism and wasting public money. Other charges against him included acts of high treason.

Impeachment fell out of use after 1459, but Parliament revived it in the early 17th century to try the King's ministers. In 1621, Parliament impeached the King's Attorney General, Sir Henry Yelverton, for high crimes and misdemeanors. The charges included failing to prosecute after starting lawsuits and using authority before it was properly his.

In 1640, at the beginning of the Long Parliament, Thomas Wentworth, 1st Earl of Strafford, was impeached for "high misdemeanours" regarding his conduct in Ireland. Despite the repeated assurances of King Charles I, Strafford was eventually executed ("Put not your trust in princes.") the following year.

After the Restoration, the scope of the charge grew to include negligence and abuse of power or trust while in office. For example, charges in the impeachment of Edward Russell, 1st Earl of Orford in 1701 included many violations of trust in his positions. In this case, he abused his position in the Privy Council to make profits for himself; as Treasurer of the Navy he embezzled funds; and as Admiral of the Fleet he got a commission for the pirate William Kidd.

== United States ==
"High crimes and misdemeanors" is a phrase from Section 4 of Article Two of the United States Constitution: "The President, Vice President and all civil Officers of the United States, shall be removed from Office on Impeachment for, and Conviction of, Treason, Bribery, or other high Crimes and Misdemeanors."

"High," in the legal and common vocabulary of the 17th and 18th centuries of "high crimes," is the activity by or against those who have special duties acquired by taking an oath of office that is not shared with ordinary persons. A high crime can be done only by someone in a unique position of authority, which is political, who does things to circumvent justice. The phrase "high crimes and misdemeanors," used together, was a common phrase when the U.S. Constitution was written and did not require any stringent or demanding criteria for determining guilt. The phrase was historically used to cover an extensive range of crimes.

The Judiciary Committee's 1974 report "The Historical Origins of Impeachment" stated: "'High Crimes and Misdemeanors' has traditionally been considered a 'term of art', like such other constitutional phrases as 'levying war' and 'due process.' The Supreme Court has held that such phrases must be construed, not according to modern usage, but according to what the framers meant when they adopted them. In 1807, Chief Justice John Marshall wrote of the phrase "levying war":

It is a technical term. It is used in a very old statute of that country whose language is our language, and whose laws form the substratum of our laws. It is scarcely conceivable that the term was not employed by the framers of our constitution in the sense which had been affixed to it by those from whom we borrowed it.

Since 1386, the English Parliament had used the term "high crimes and misdemeanors" to describe one of the grounds to impeach officials of the crown. Officials accused of "high crimes and misdemeanors" were accused of offenses as varied as misappropriating government funds, appointing unfit subordinates, not prosecuting cases, promoting themselves ahead of more deserving candidates, threatening a grand jury, disobeying an order from Parliament, arresting a man to keep him from running for Parliament, helping "suppress petitions to the King to call a Parliament," etc..

Benjamin Franklin asserted that the power of impeachment and removal was necessary for those times when the Executive "rendered himself obnoxious," and the Constitution should provide for the "regular punishment of the Executive when his conduct should deserve it, and for his honorable acquittal when he should be unjustly accused." James Madison said that "impeachment... was indispensable" to defend the community against "the incapacity, negligence or perfidy of the chief Magistrate." With a single executive, Madison argued, unlike a legislature whose collective nature provided security, "loss of capacity or corruption was more within the compass of probable events, and either of them might be fatal to the Republic."

The process of impeaching someone in the House of Representatives and convicting in the Senate is complex, made to be the balance against efforts to remove people from office for minor reasons that could easily be determined by the standard of "high crimes and misdemeanors". It was George Mason who offered up the term "high crimes and misdemeanors" as one of the criteria to remove public officials who abuse their office. Their original intentions can be gleaned by the phrases and words that were proposed before, such as "high misdemeanor," "maladministration," or "other crime." Edmund Randolph said impeachment should be reserved for those who "misbehave." Charles Cotesworth Pinckney said, It should be reserved "for those who behave amiss, or betray their public trust." As can be seen from all these references to "high crimes and misdemeanors," the definition or its rationale does not relate to specific offenses. This gives much freedom of interpretation to the House of Representatives and the Senate. Constitutional law, by nature, is not concerned with being specific. The courts, through precedence and the legislature, through lawmaking, make constitutional provisions clear. In this case, the legislature (the House of Representatives and the Senate) acts as a court and can create a precedent.

In Federalist No. 65, Alexander Hamilton said, "those offences which proceed from the misconduct of public men, or, in other words, from the abuse or violation of some public trust. They are of a nature which may with peculiar propriety be denominated political, as they relate chiefly to injuries done immediately to the society itself."

The first impeachment conviction by the United States Senate was in 1804 of John Pickering, a judge of the United States District Court for the District of New Hampshire, for chronic intoxication. Federal judges have been impeached and removed from office for tax evasion, conspiracy to solicit a bribe, and making false statements to a grand jury.

President Andrew Johnson was impeached on 24 February 1868, in the United U.S. House of Representatives on eleven articles of impeachment detailing his "high crimes and misdemeanors", in accordance with Article Two of the United States Constitution. (The Senate fell one vote short of conviction.) The House's primary charge against Johnson was with violation of the Tenure of Office Act, passed by Congress the previous year. Specifically, he had removed Edwin M. Stanton, the Secretary of War from office and replaced him with John Schofield, but it was unclear if Johnson had violated the act as Stanton was nominated by President Abraham Lincoln and not by Johnson.

During the impeachment of Bill Clinton in 1999, White House Counsel Charles Ruff described a "narrow" interpretation of "high crimes and misdemeanors" as requiring "a standard that the framers intentionally set at this extraordinarily high level to ensure that only the most serious offenses and in particular those that subverted our system of government would justify overturning a popular election". Writing in 1999, Mark R. Slusar commented that the narrow interpretation seemed most common among legal scholars and senators.

Alejandro Mayorkas was impeached in 2024 but the Senate ended the trial without determining guilt after deciding that the articles of impeachment did not allege high crimes and misdemeanors and so did not constitute a valid impeachment.

== See also ==
- High misdemeanor
- Political corruption
