= 1852 Democratic National Convention =

U.S. political event held in Baltimore, Maryland

- 1852 presidential election
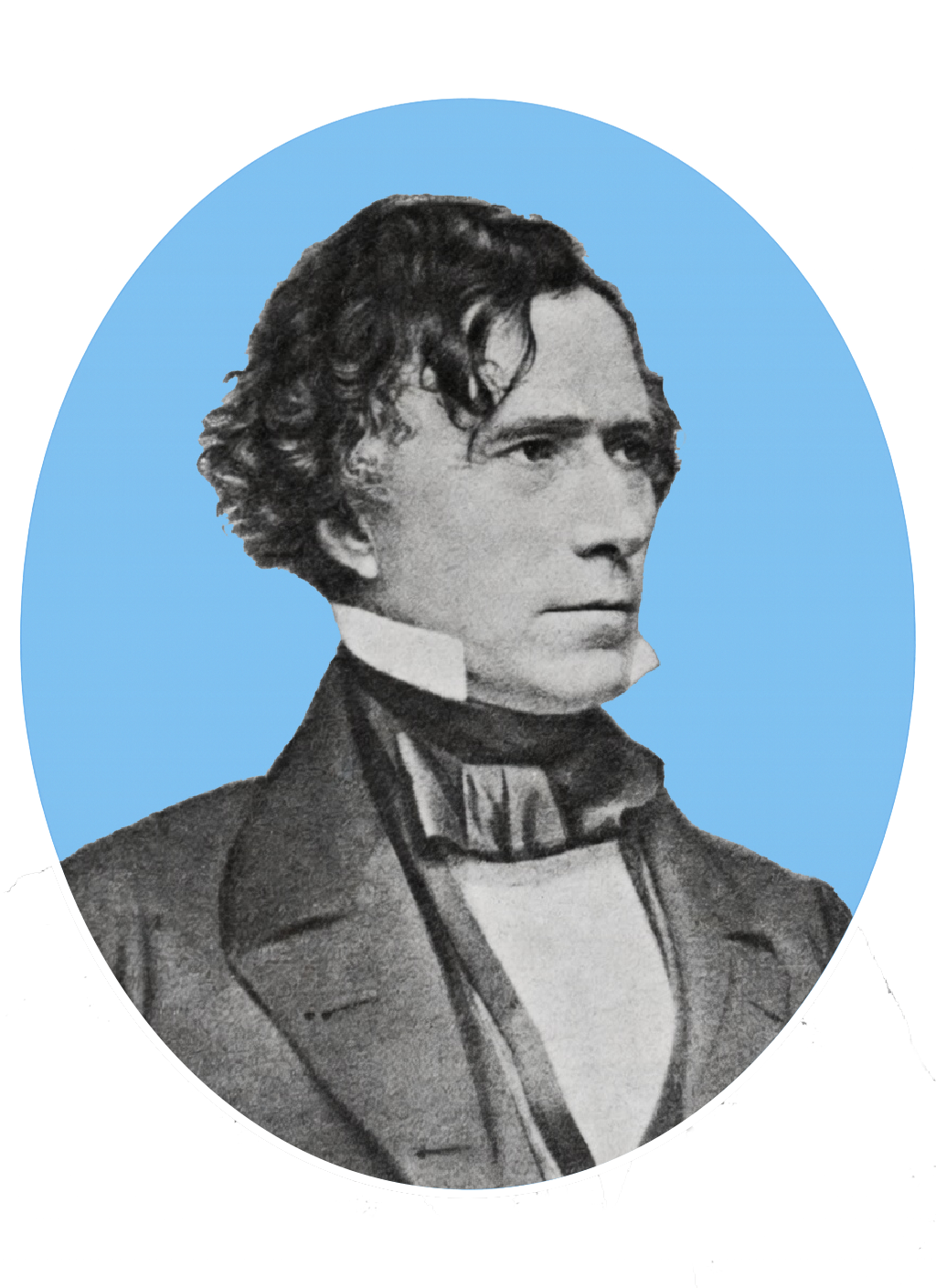
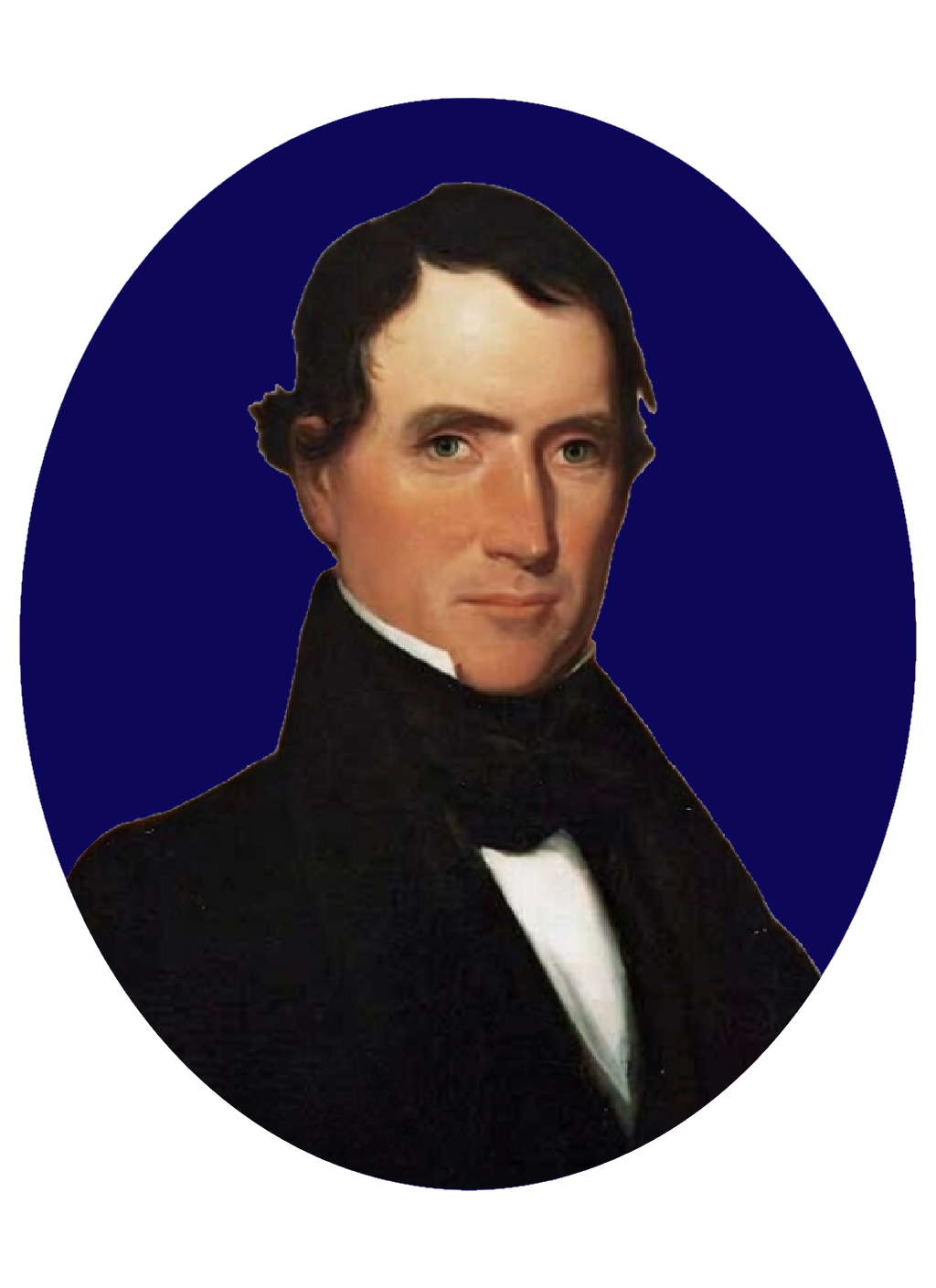
- Nominees; Pierce and King

Convention
- Dates: June 1–5, 1852
- City: Baltimore, Maryland
- Venue: Maryland Institute for the Promotion of the Mechanic Arts

Candidates
- Presidential nominee: Franklin Pierce of New Hampshire
- Vice-presidential nominee: William R. King of Alabama

The 1852 Democratic National Convention was a presidential nominating convention that met from June 1 to June 5 in Baltimore, Maryland. It was held to nominate the Democratic Party's candidates for president and vice president in the 1852 election. The convention selected former Senator Franklin Pierce of New Hampshire for president and Senator William R. King of Alabama for vice president.

Four major candidates vied for the presidential nomination – Lewis Cass of Michigan, the nominee in 1848, who had the backing of northerners in support of the Compromise of 1850; James Buchanan of Pennsylvania, popular in the South as well as in his home state; Stephen A. Douglas of Illinois, candidate of the expansionists and the railroad interests; and William L. Marcy of New York, whose strength was centered in his home state. Cass led on the first nineteen ballots of the convention, but was unable to win the necessary two-thirds majority. Buchanan pulled ahead on the twentieth ballot, but he too was unable to win a two-thirds majority. Pierce won votes for the first time on the 35th ballot, and was nominated almost unanimously on the 49th ballot.

King was nominated on the second vice presidential ballot, defeating Senator Solomon W. Downs and several other candidates. The Democratic ticket went on to win the 1852 election, defeating the Whig ticket of Winfield Scott and William Alexander Graham.

== Convention proceedings ==
The convention took place at the Maryland Institute for the Promotion of the Mechanic Arts and was called to order by Democratic National Committee chairman Benjamin F. Hallett. Romulus M. Saunders served as the temporary convention chairman and John W. Davis served as the permanent convention president. Delegates at the convention approved a platform that largely mimicked the one adopted in 1848. Two notable additions were the denouncement of a national bank and an endorsement of the Fugitive Slave Act of 1850.

== Presidential nomination ==
=== Dark horse candidates ===
Former Senator
Franklin Pierce
of New Hampshire

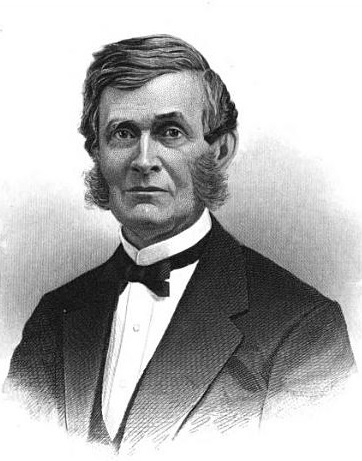
Former Representative
Henry C. Murphy
of New York

=== Major presidential candidates ===
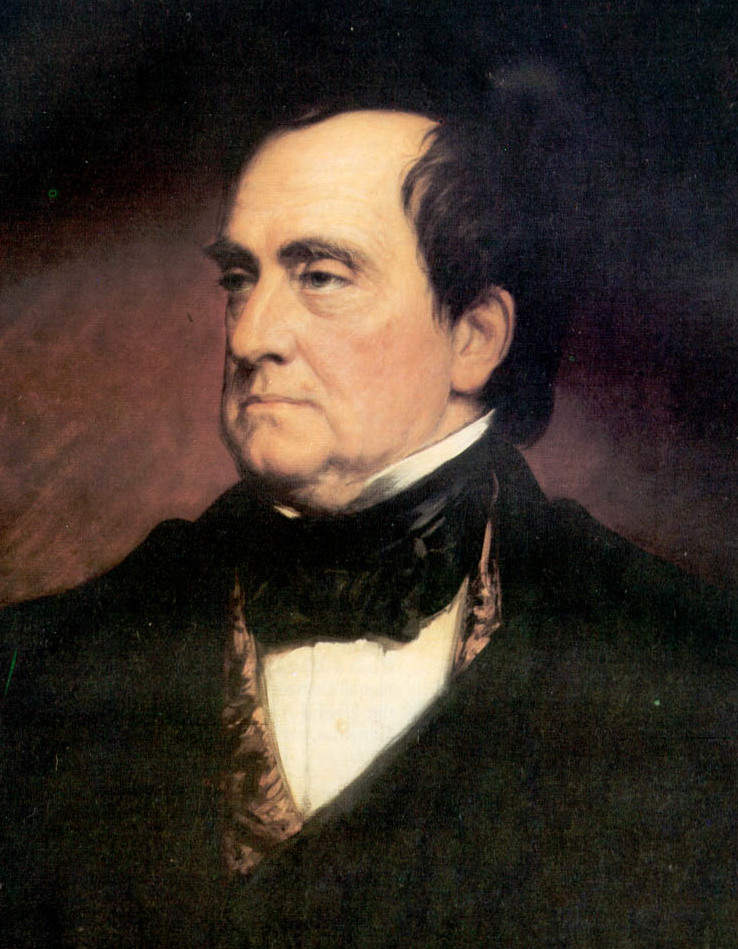
Senator
Lewis Cass
of Michigan

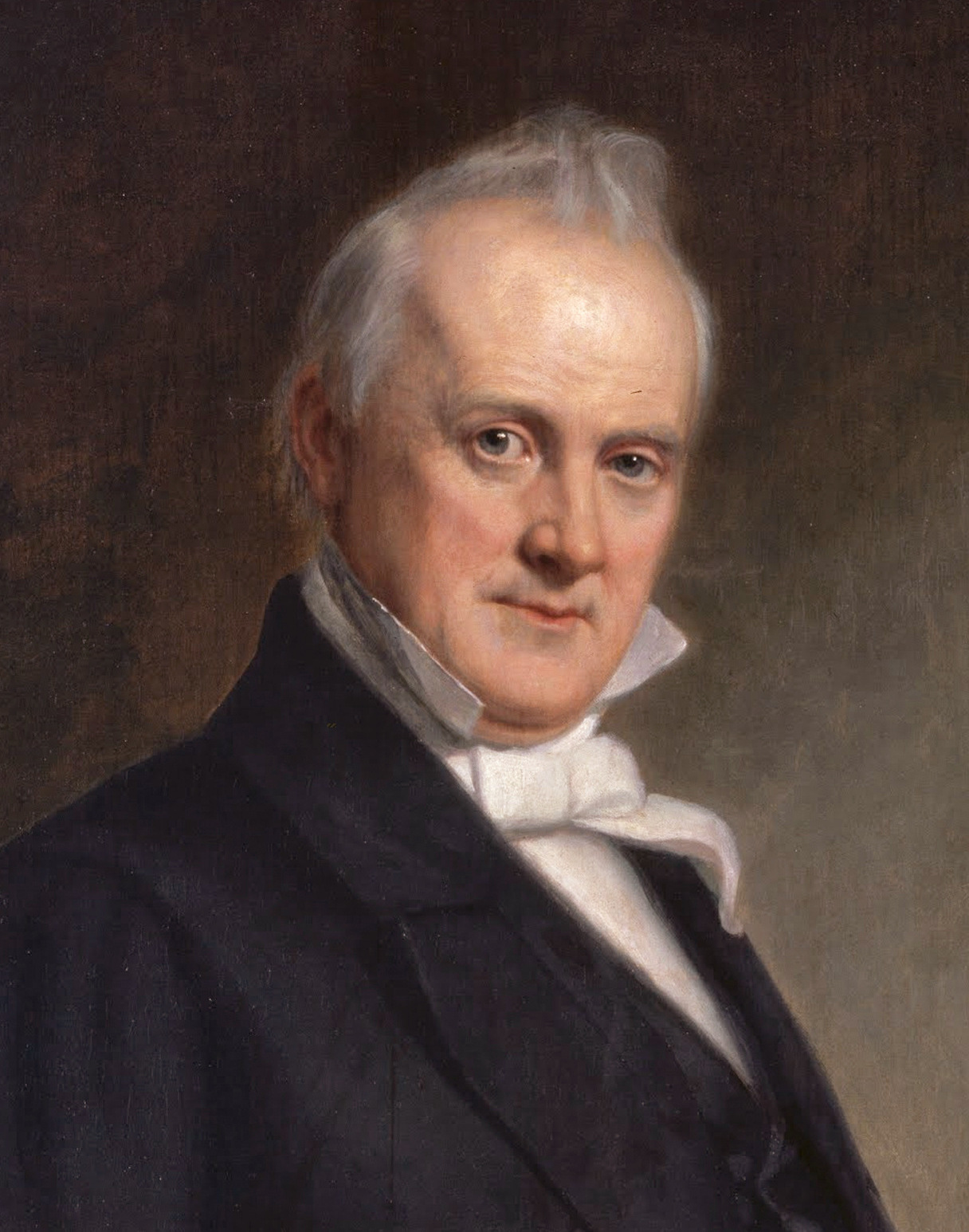
Former Secretary of State
James Buchanan
of Pennsylvania

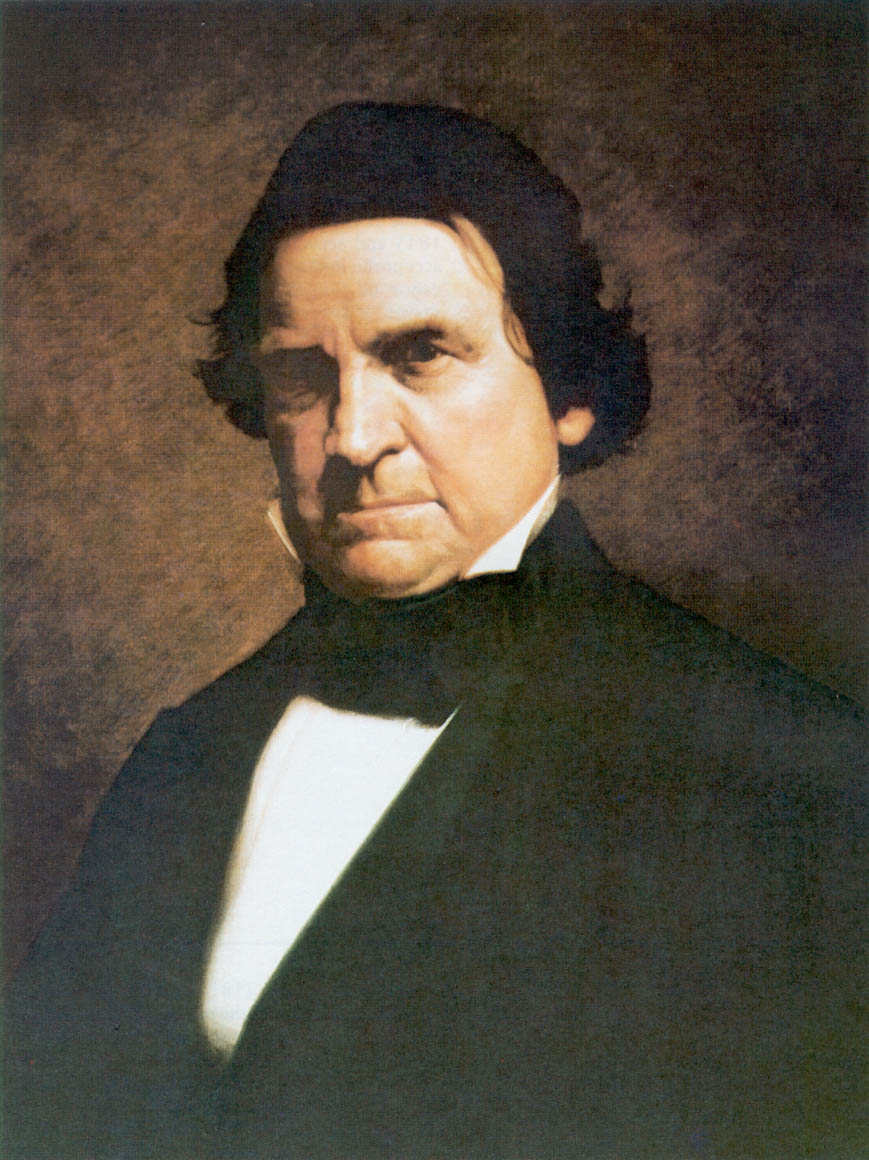
Former Secretary of War
William L. Marcy
of New York

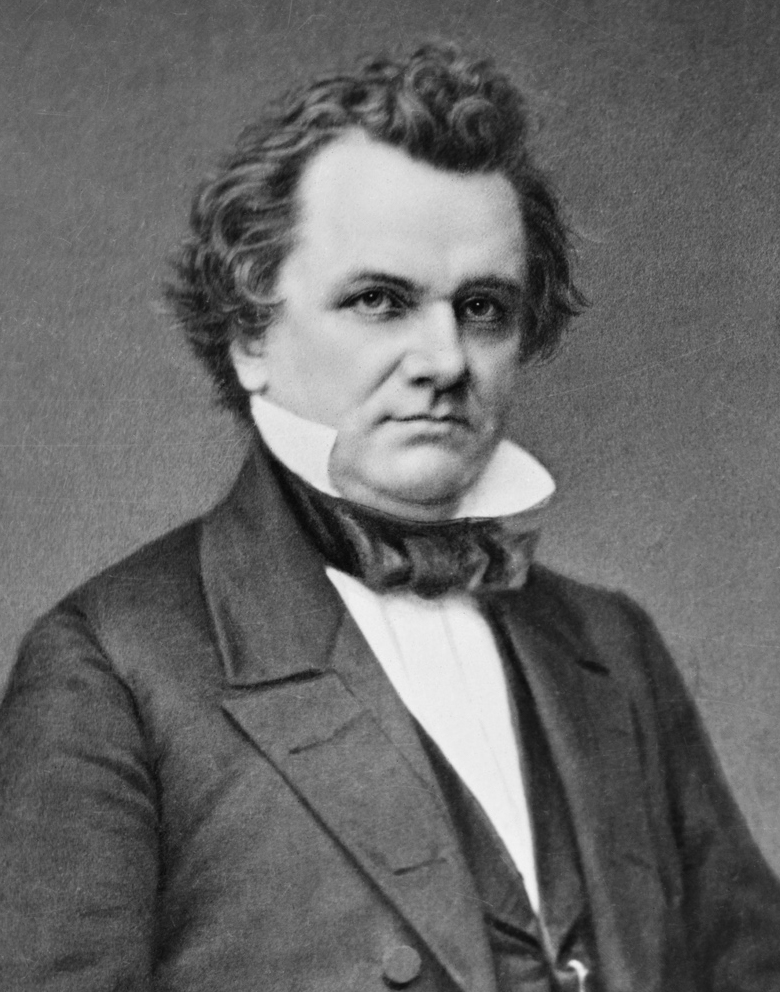
Senator
Stephen A. Douglas
of Illinois

=== Minor presidential candidates ===
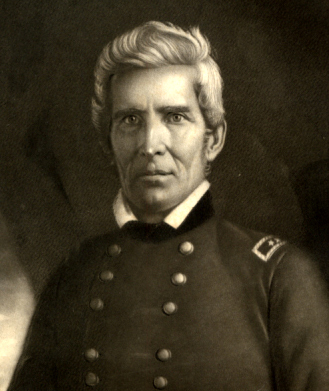
Former Representative
William O. Butler
of Kentucky

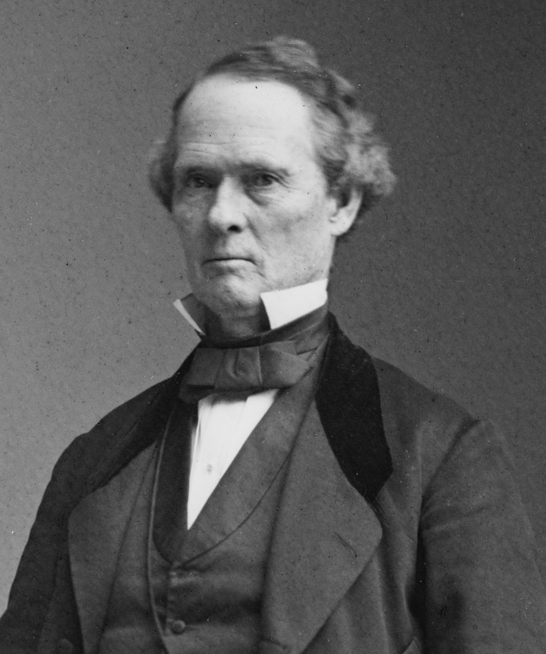
House Delegate
Joseph Lane
of Oregon

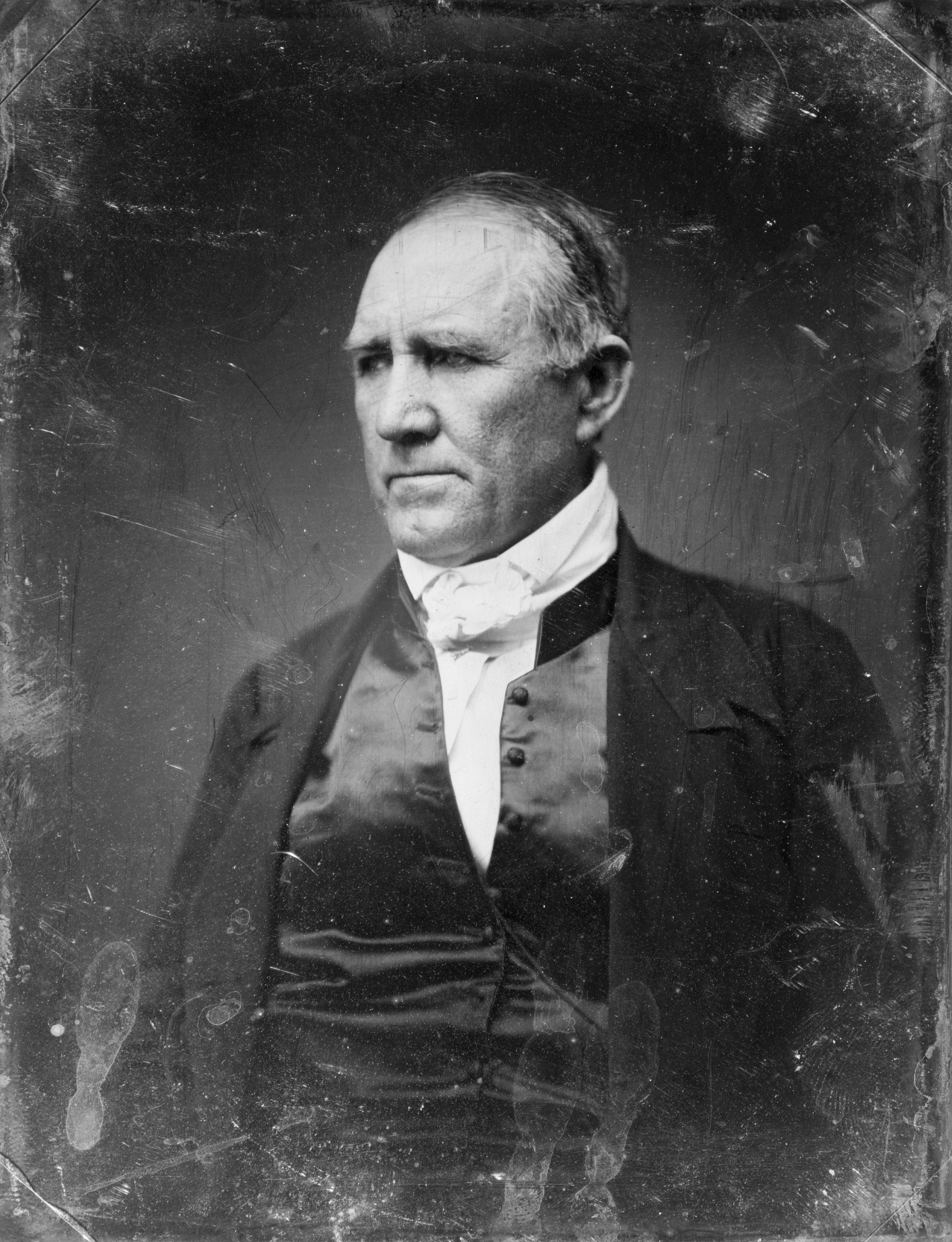
Senator
Sam Houston
of Texas

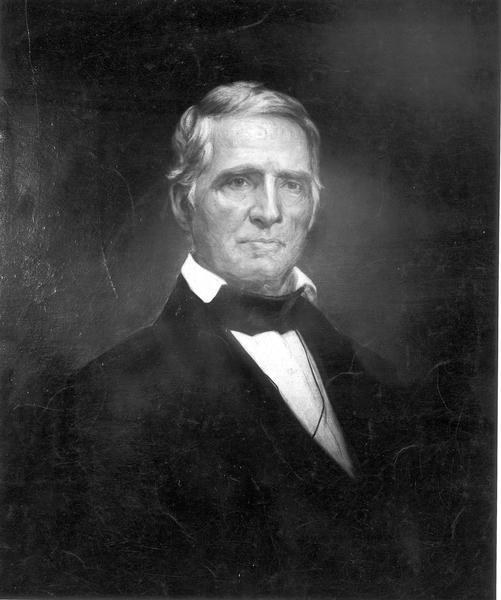
Senator
Henry Dodge
of Wisconsin

=== Declined ===
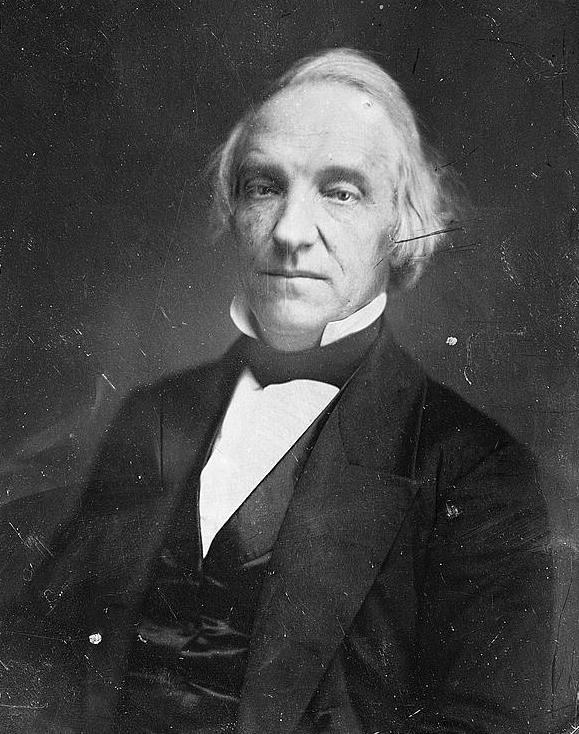
Former Senator
Daniel S. Dickinson
of New York
(Endorsed Cass)

=== Balloting ===
As Democrats convened in Baltimore in June 1852, four major candidates vied for the nomination – Lewis Cass of Michigan, the nominee in 1848, who had the backing of northerners in support of the Compromise of 1850; James Buchanan of Pennsylvania, popular in the South as well as in his home state; Stephen A. Douglas of Illinois, candidate of the expansionists and the railroad interests; and William L. Marcy of New York, whose strength was centered in his home state. Throughout the balloting, numerous favorite son candidates received a few votes.

With a two-thirds majority required to win, Cass led on the first 19 ballots, with Buchanan second and Douglas and Marcy exchanging third and fourth places. Buchanan took the lead on the 20th ballot and retained it on each of the next nine tallies. Douglas managed a narrow lead on the 30th and 31st ballots. Cass then recaptured first place through the 44th ballot. Marcy carried the next four ballots.

Franklin Pierce of New Hampshire, a former Congressman and Senator, did not get on the board until the 35th ballot, when the Virginia delegation brought him forward as a compromise choice, selecting Pierce as their dark horse by one vote over former New York Congressman and Brooklyn Mayor Henry C. Murphy, and then supporting him as a unit. After being nominated by the Virginia delegation, Pierce's support remained steady until the 46th ballot, when it began to increase at Cass's expense. Pierce's support was consolidated in subsequent voting, and he was nominated nearly unanimously on the 49th ballot.

According to Edward Stanwood, there was "no doubt that the nomination of General Pierce was carefully planned before the convention met. The originator of the scheme was James W. Bradbury, then a senator from Maine, a college mate and lifelong friend of Pierce."

Presidential Ballot
	1st	2nd	3rd	4th	5th	6th	7th	8th	9th	10th	11th	12th	13th	14th	15th	16th	17th	18th	19th	20th	21st	22nd	23rd	24th	25th
Cass	116	118	119	115	114	114	113	113	112	111	101	98	98	99	99	99	99	96	89	81	60	43	37	33	34
Buchanan	93	95	94	89	89	88	88	88	87	86	87	88	88	87	87	87	87	85	85	92	102	104	103	103	101
Marcy	27	27	26	25	26	26	26	26	27	27	27	27	26	26	26	26	26	25	26	26	26	26	26	26	26
Douglas	20	23	21	31	33	34	34	34	39	40	50	51	51	51	51	51	51	56	63	64	64	77	78	80	79
Butler	2	1	1	1	1	1	1	1	1	1	1	1	1	1	1	1	1	1	1	1	13	15	20	23	24
Dickinson	1	1	0	0	1	1	1	1	1	1	1	1	1	1	1	1	1	1	1	1	1	1	1	1	1
Lane	13	13	13	13	13	13	13	13	13	14	13	13	13	13	13	13	13	13	13	13	13	13	13	13	13
Houston	8	6	7	7	8	8	9	9	8	8	8	9	10	10	10	10	9	11	9	10	9	9	10	9	10
Weller	4	0	0	0	0	0	0	0	0	0	0	0	0	0	0	0	0	0	0	0	0	0	0	0	0
Dodge	3	3	3	3	3	0	3	3	0	0	0	0	0	0	0	0	0	0	0	0	0	0	0	0	0
Blank	9	9	12	12	8	11	8	8	8	8	8	8	8	8	8	8	9	8	9	8	8	8	8	8	8

Presidential Ballot
	26th	27th	28th	29th	30th	31st	32nd	33rd	34th	35th	36th	37th	38th	39th	40th	41st	42nd	43rd	44th	45th	46th	47th	48th	49th
Pierce	0	0	0	0	0	0	0	0	0	15	30	29	29	29	29	29	29	29	29	29	44	49	55	282
Cass	33	32	28	27	33	65	98	123	130	131	122	120	107	106	107	107	101	101	101	96	78	75	72	2
Buchanan	101	98	96	93	91	78	74	72	49	39	28	28	28	28	27	27	27	27	27	27	28	28	28	0
Marcy	26	26	26	26	26	26	26	25	33	44	58	70	84	85	85	85	91	91	91	97	98	95	89	0
Douglas	80	85	88	91	92	92	80	60	53	52	43	34	33	33	33	33	33	33	33	32	32	33	33	2
Butler	24	24	25	25	20	17	1	1	1	1	1	1	1	1	1	1	1	1	1	1	1	1	1	1
Dickinson	1	1	1	1	1	1	1	1	16	1	1	1	1	1	1	1	1	1	1	1	1	1	1	0
Lane	13	13	13	13	13	0	0	0	0	0	0	0	0	0	0	0	0	0	0	0	0	0	0	0
Houston	10	9	11	12	12	9	8	6	5	5	5	5	5	5	5	5	5	5	5	5	5	5	6	1
Boyd	0	0	0	0	0	0	0	0	0	0	0	0	0	0	0	0	0	0	0	0	0	1	2	0
King	0	0	0	0	0	0	0	0	0	0	0	0	0	0	0	0	0	0	0	0	1	0	0	0
Ingersoll	0	0	0	0	0	0	0	0	0	0	0	0	0	0	0	0	0	0	0	0	0	0	1	0
Blank	8	8	8	8	8	8	8	8	9	8	8	8	8	8	8	8	8	8	8	8	8	8	8	8

1st Day of Presidential Balloting / 3rd Day of Convention (June 3, 1852)

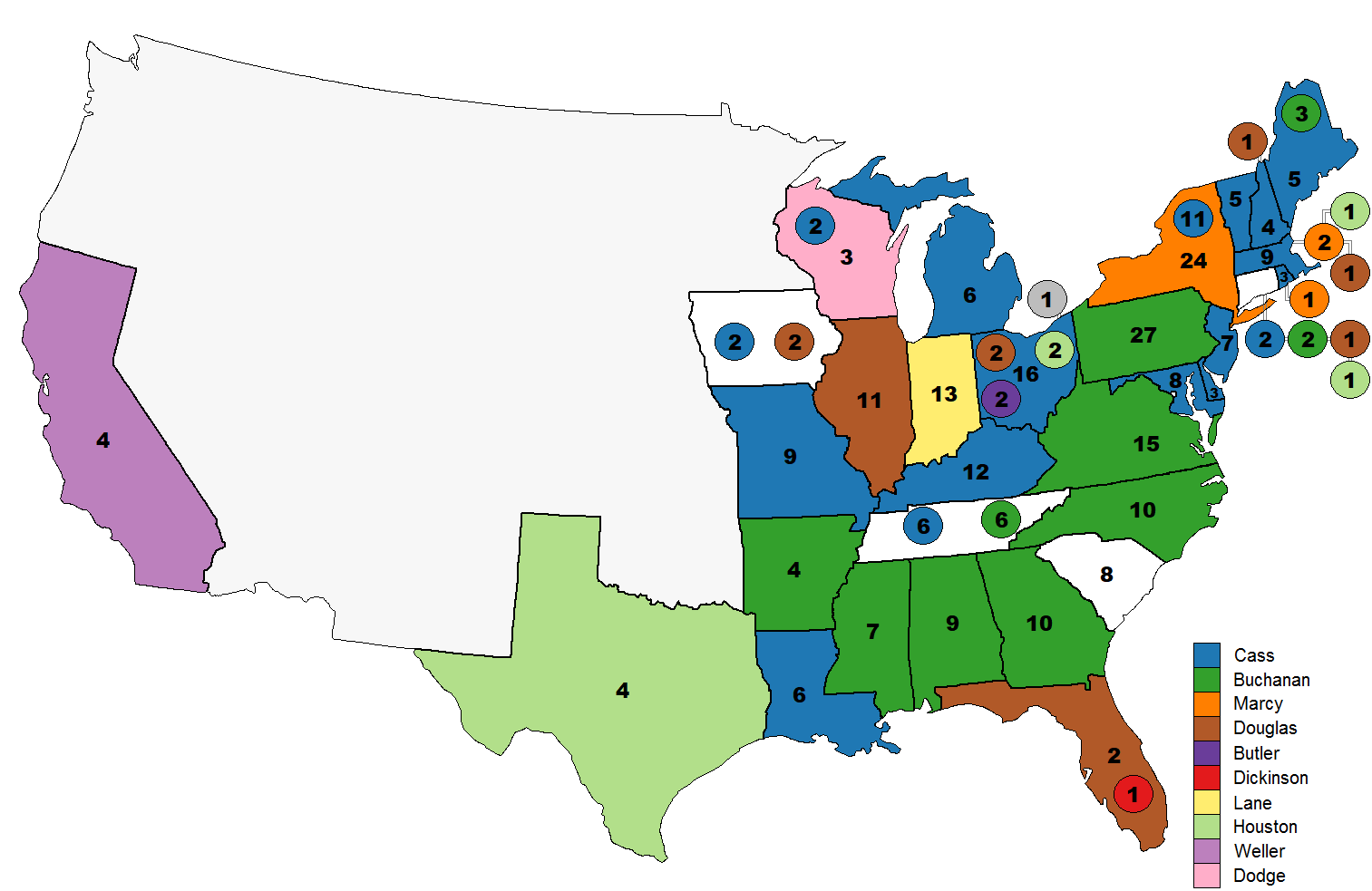
1st Ballot

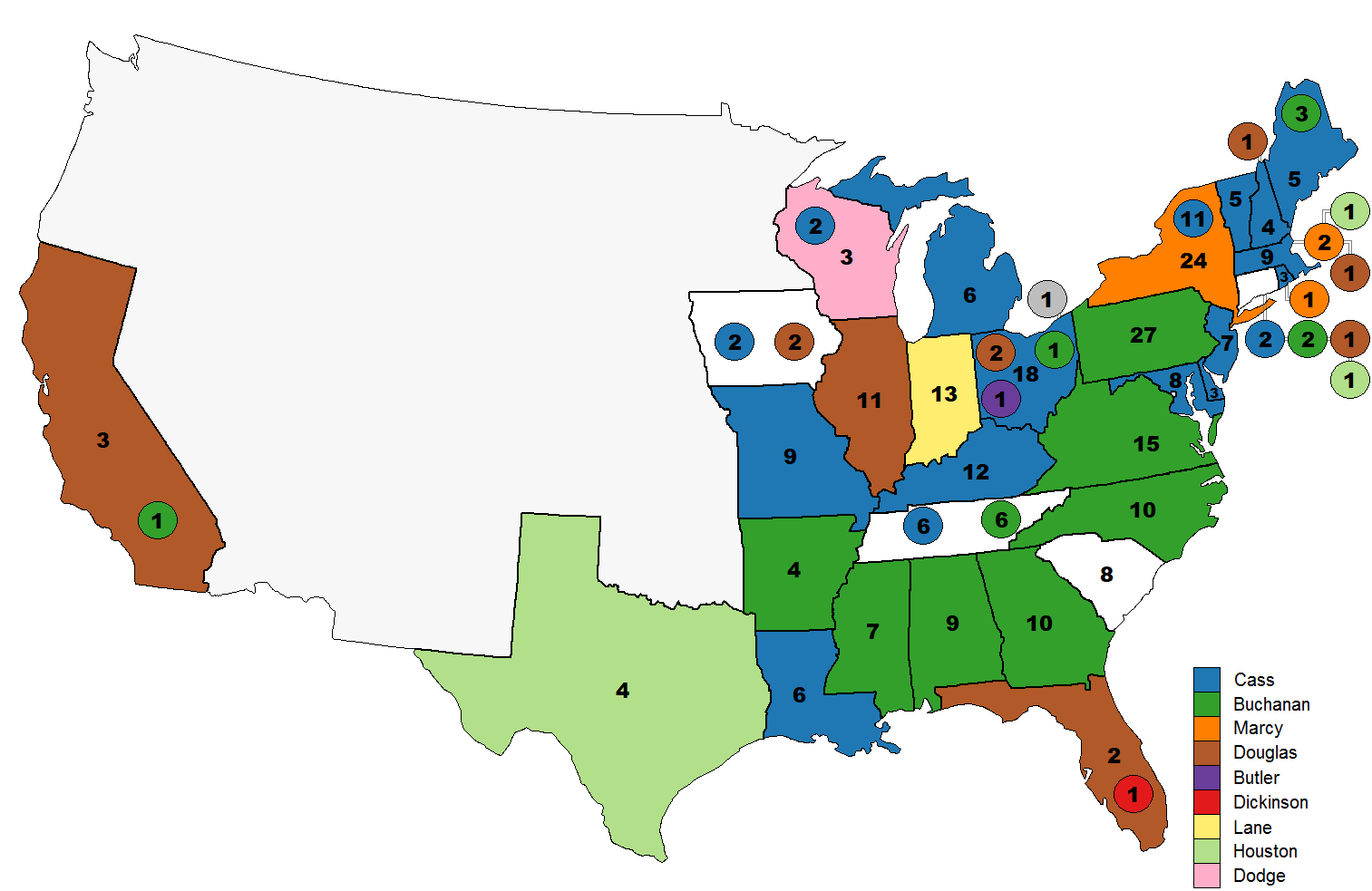
2nd Ballot

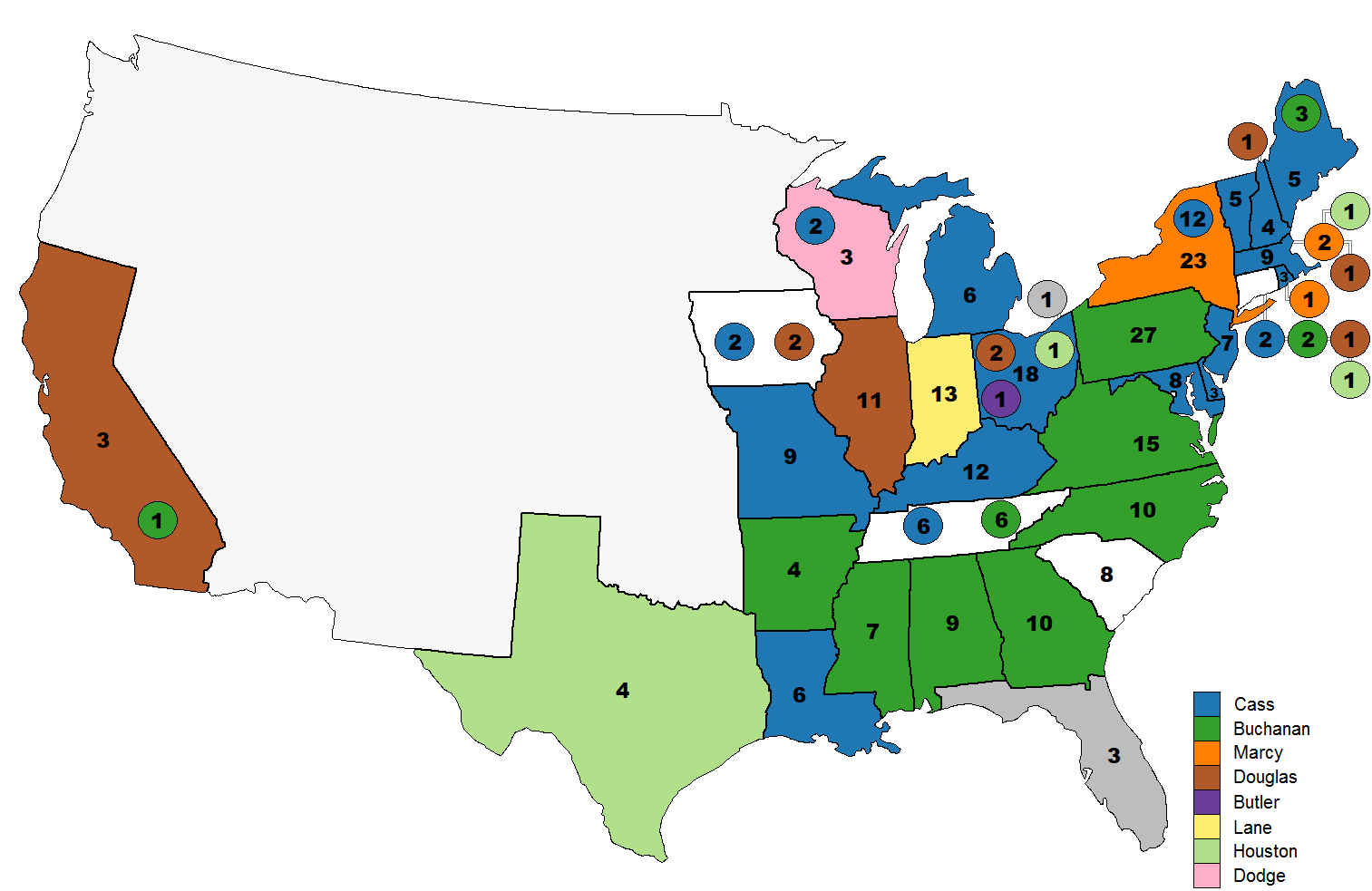
3rd Ballot
(Cass's 1st Peak)

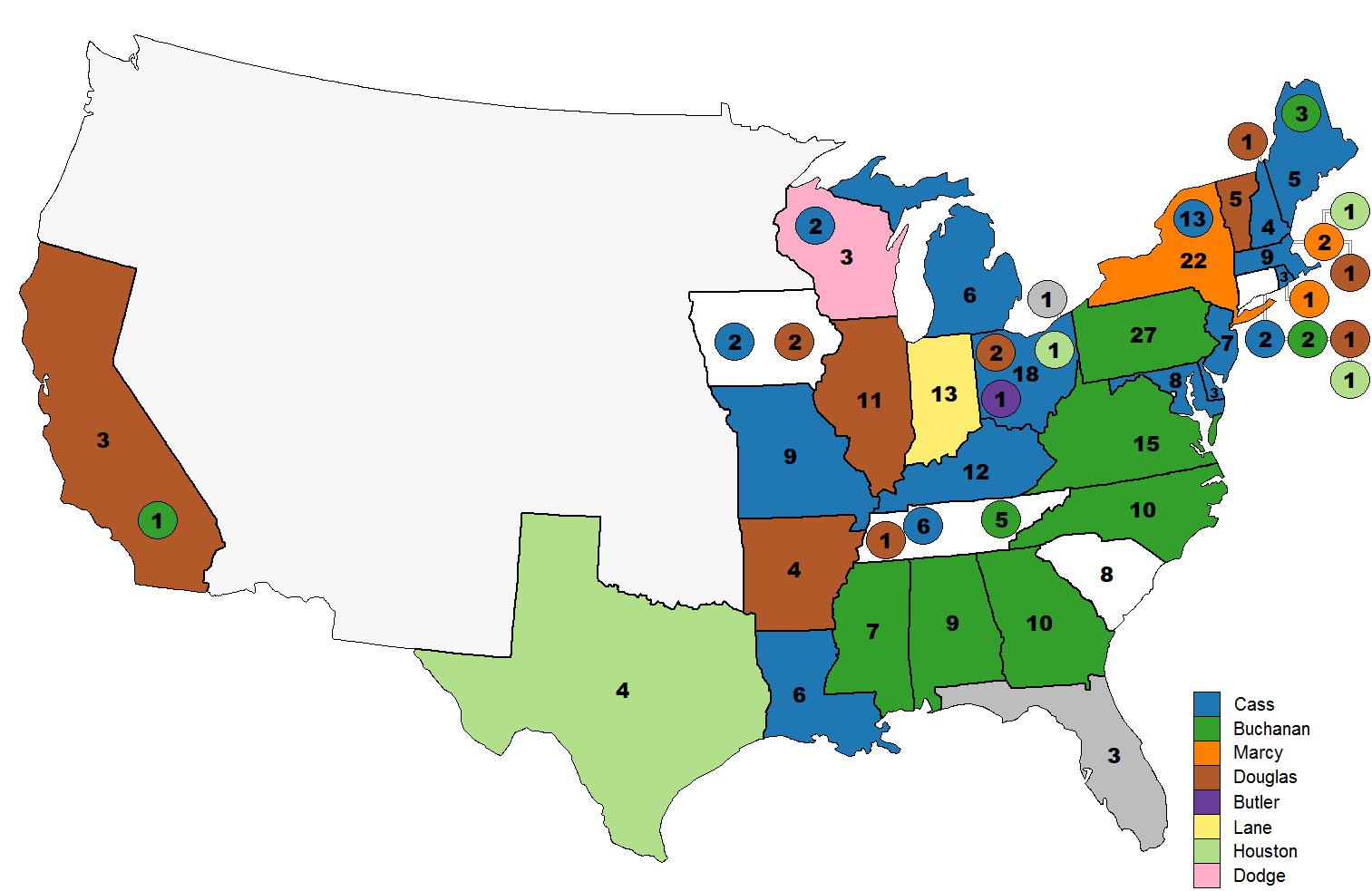
4th Ballot

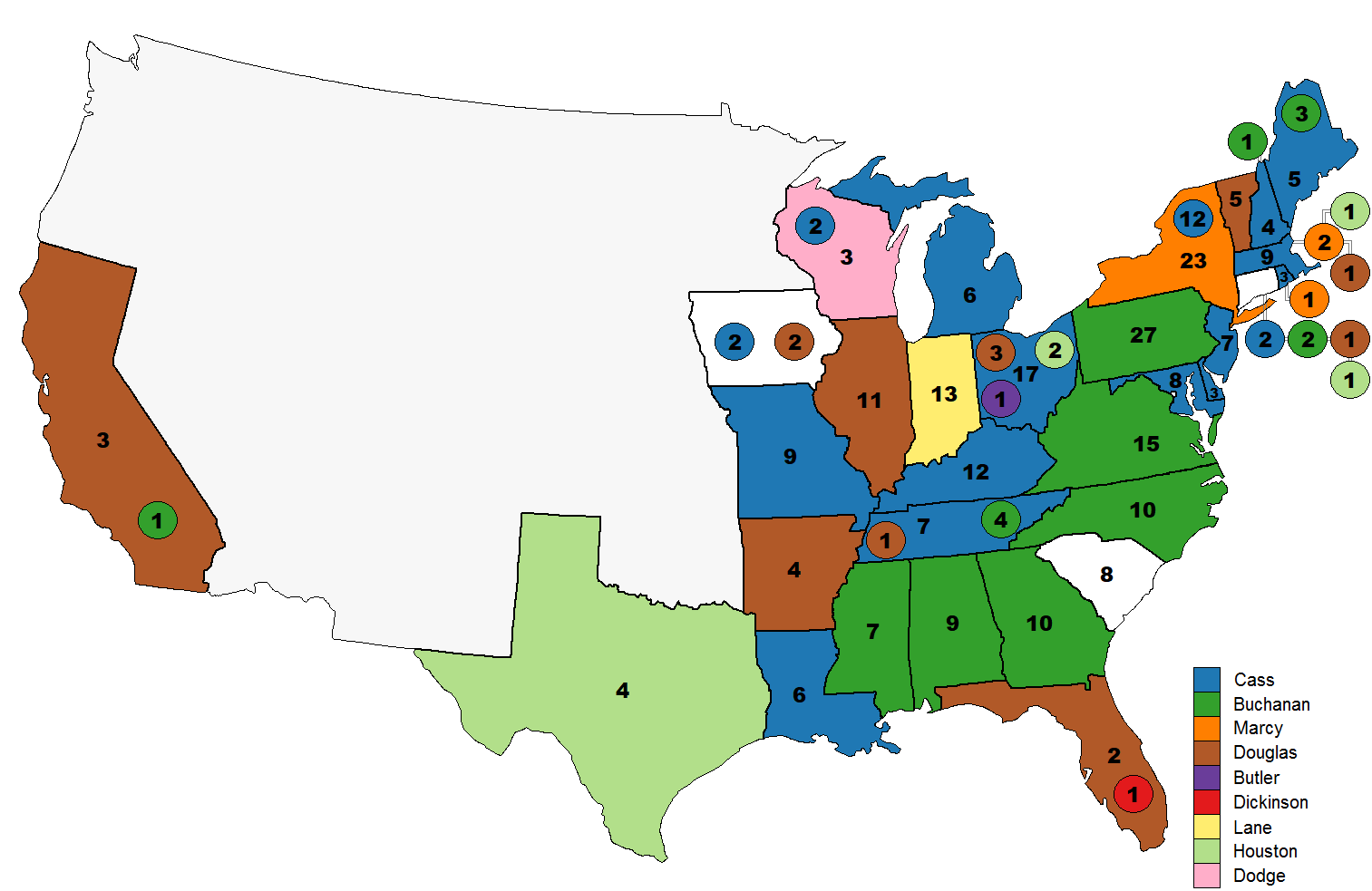
5th Ballot

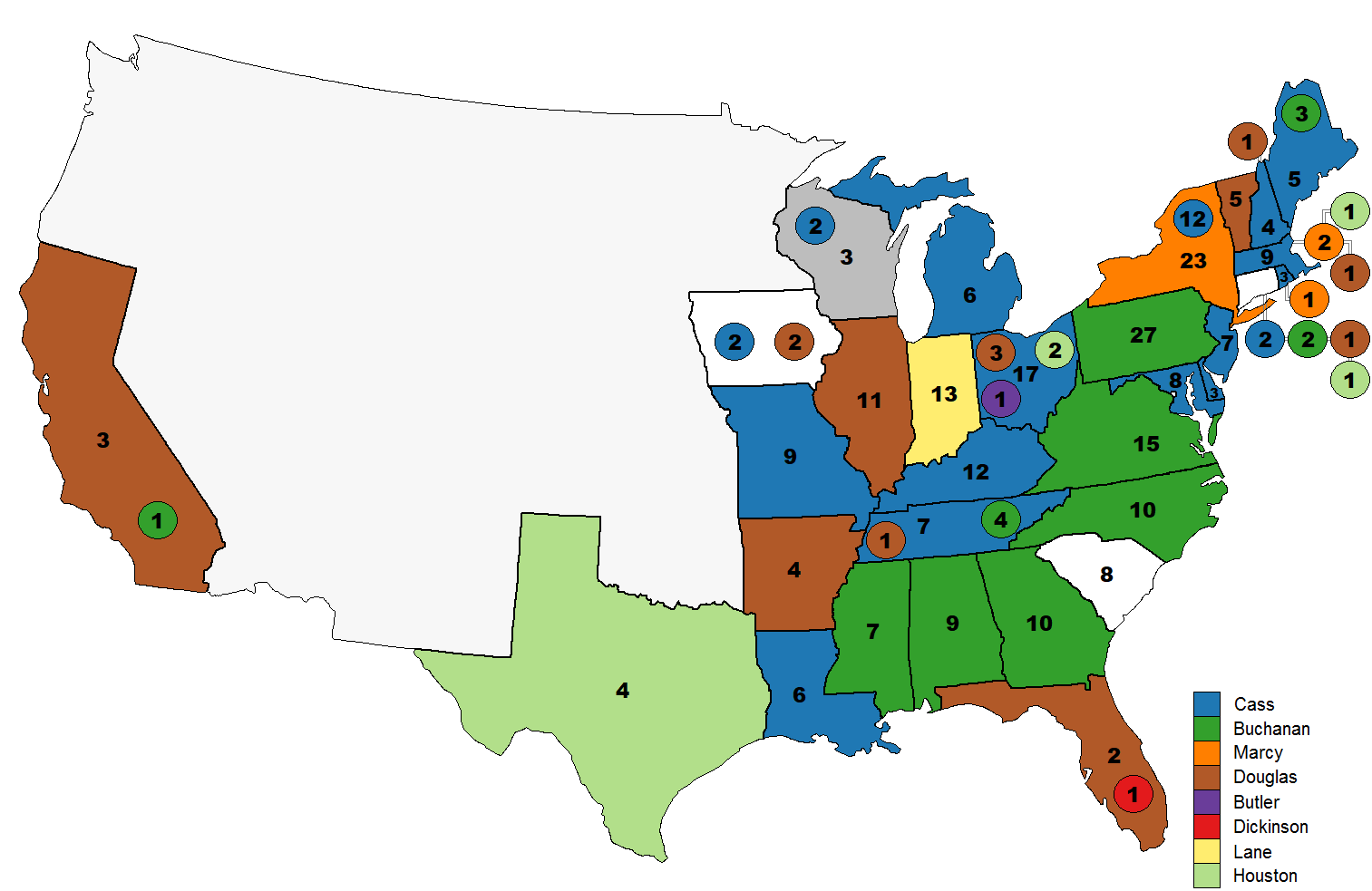
6th Ballot

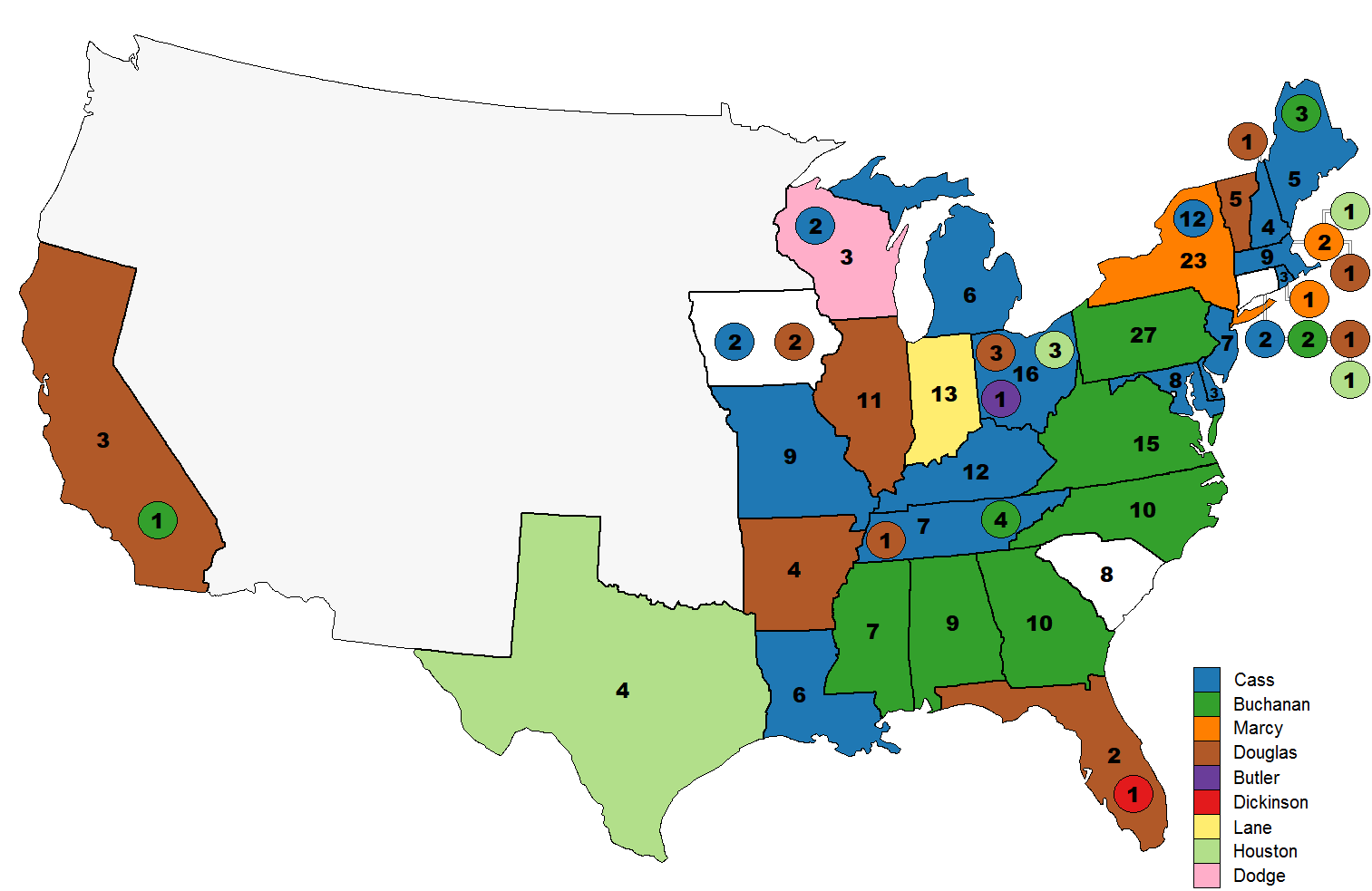
7th Ballot

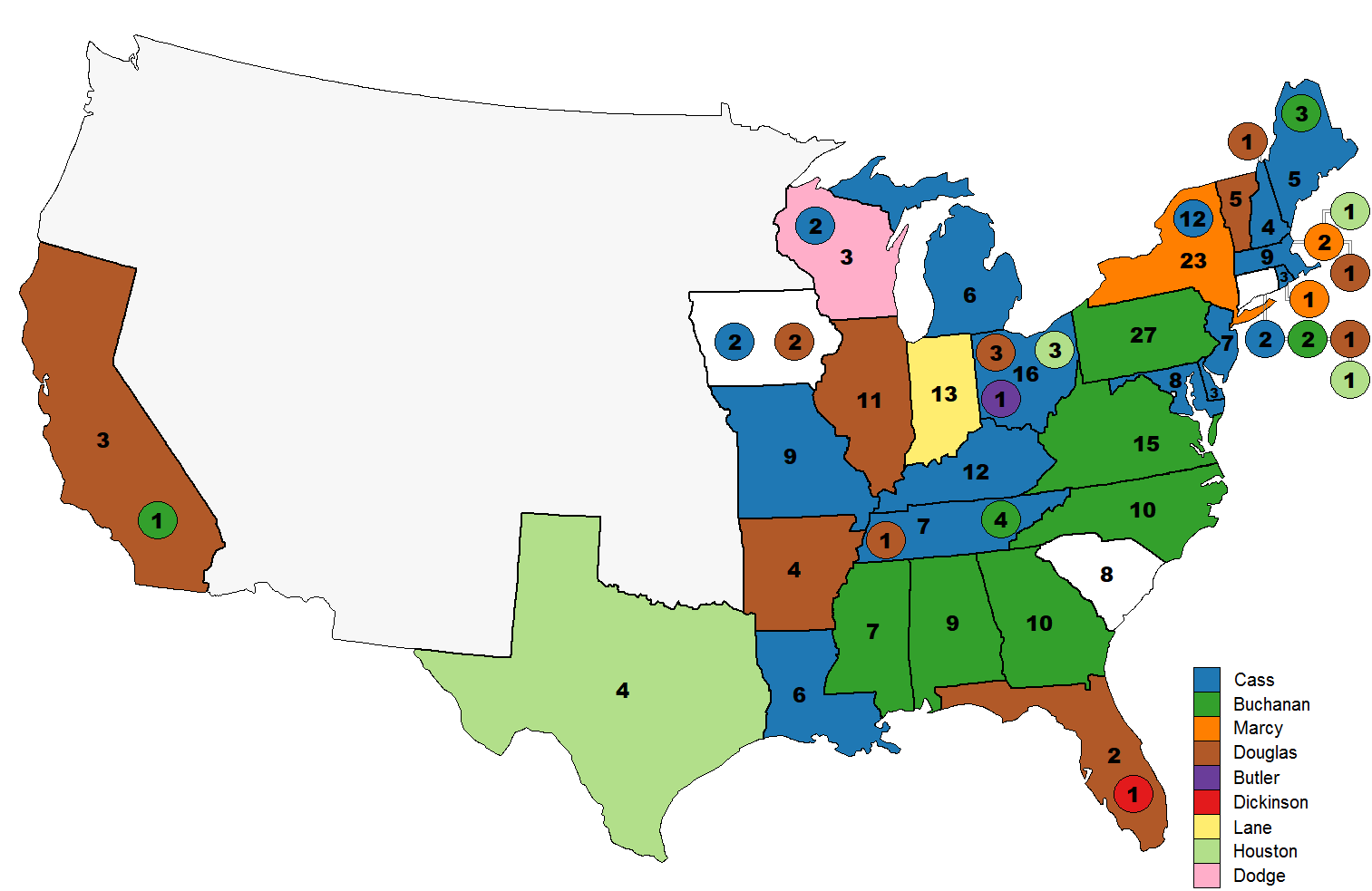
8th Ballot

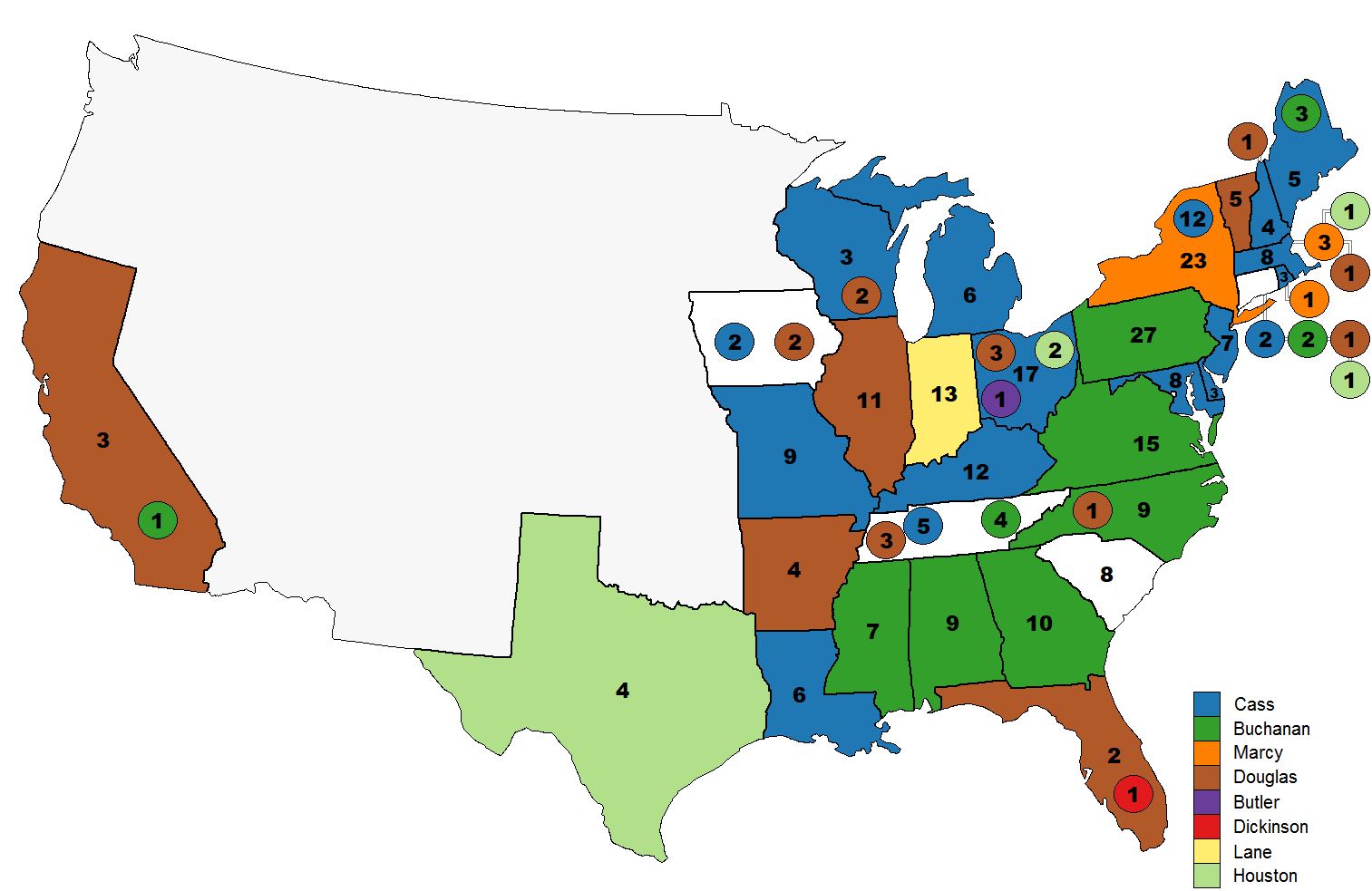
9th Ballot

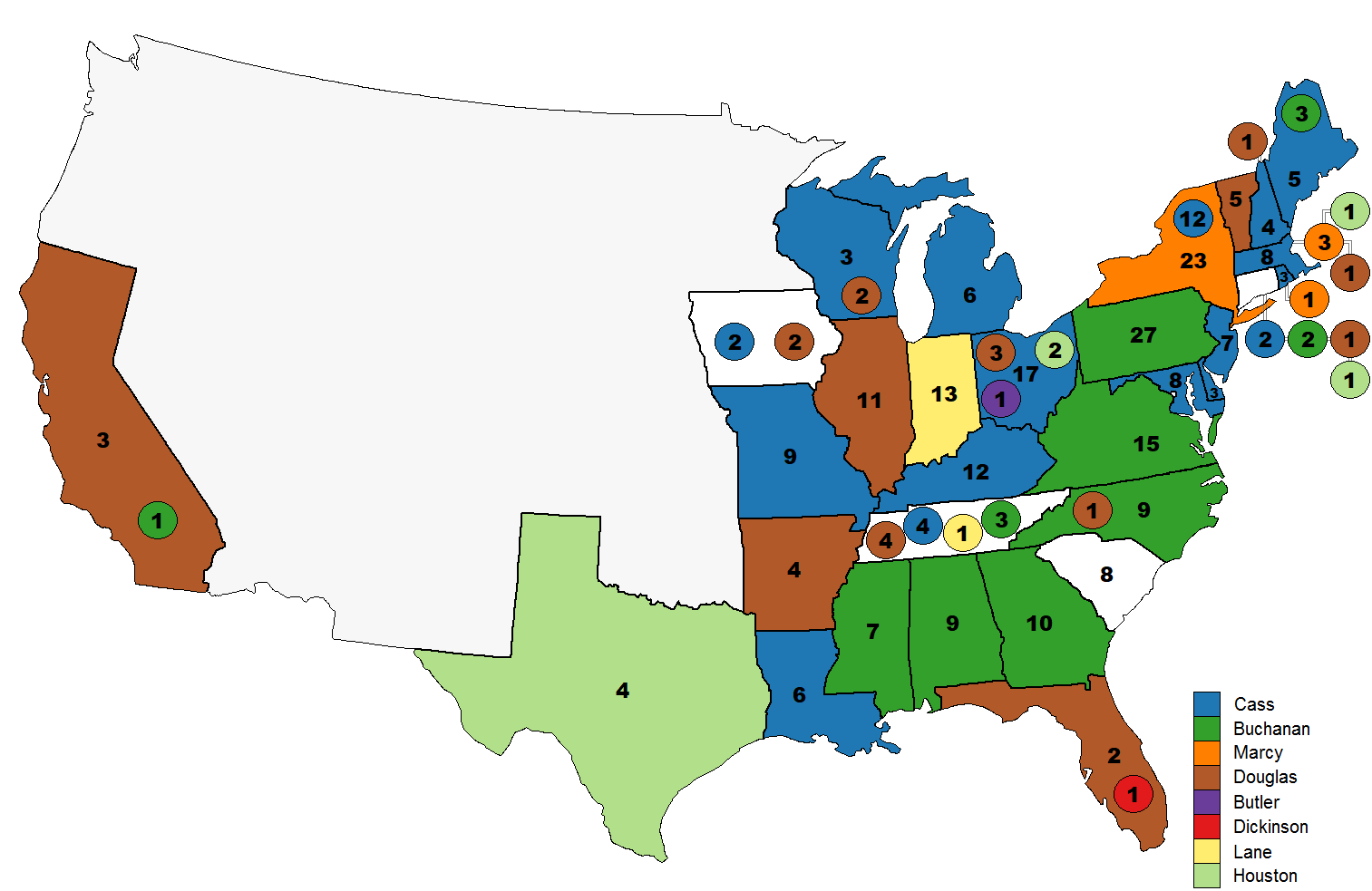
10th Ballot

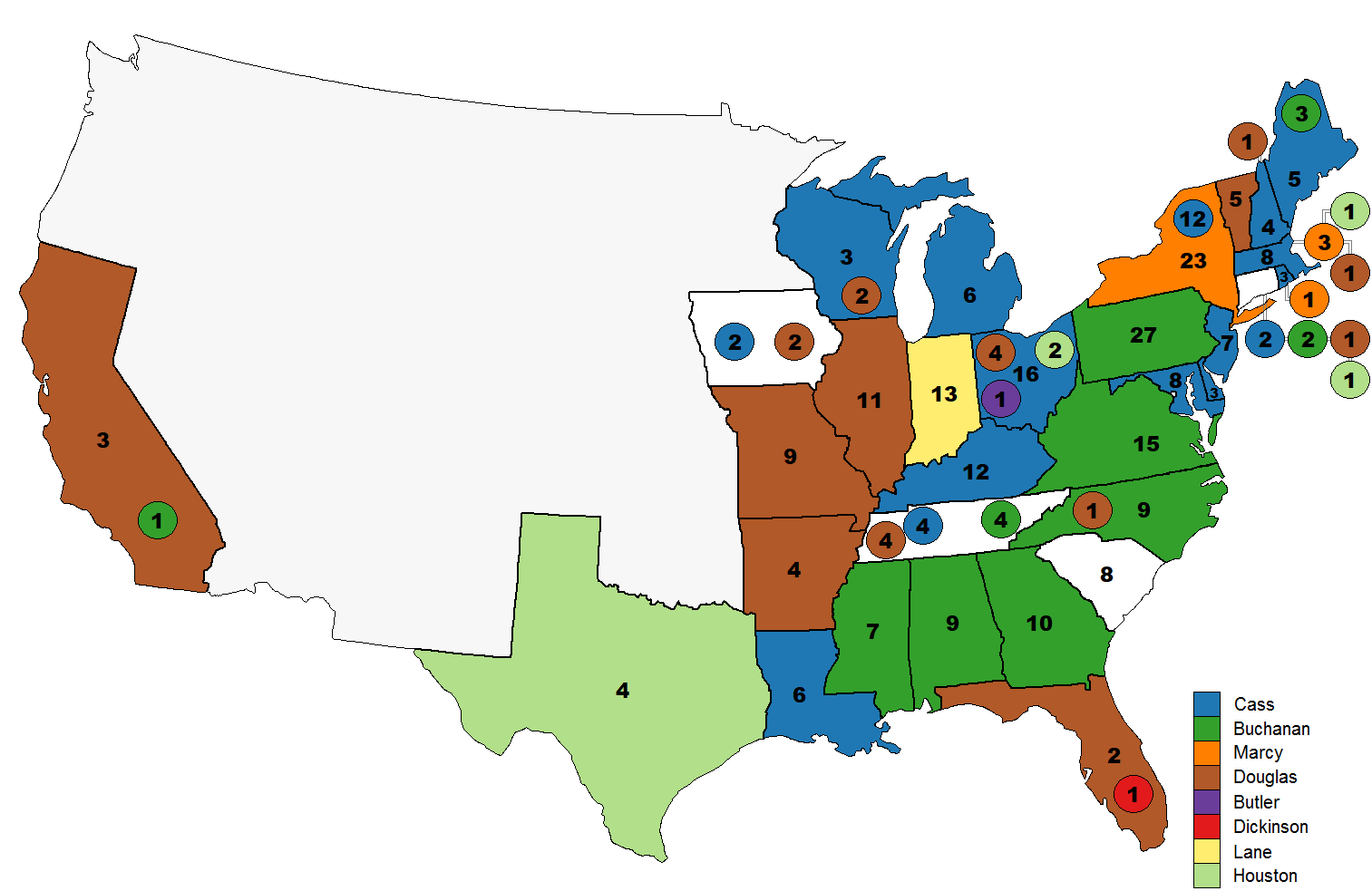
11th Ballot

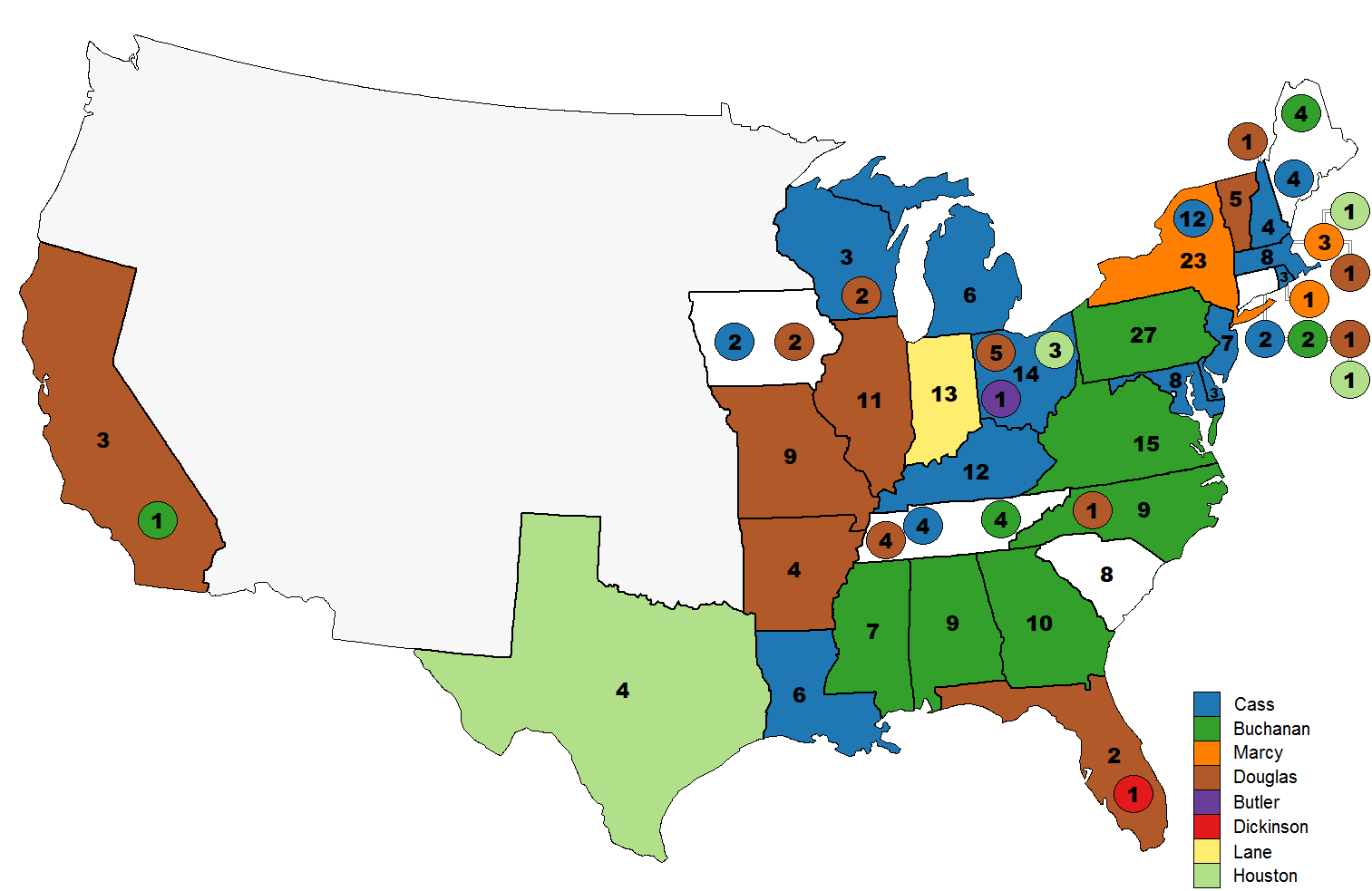
12th Ballot

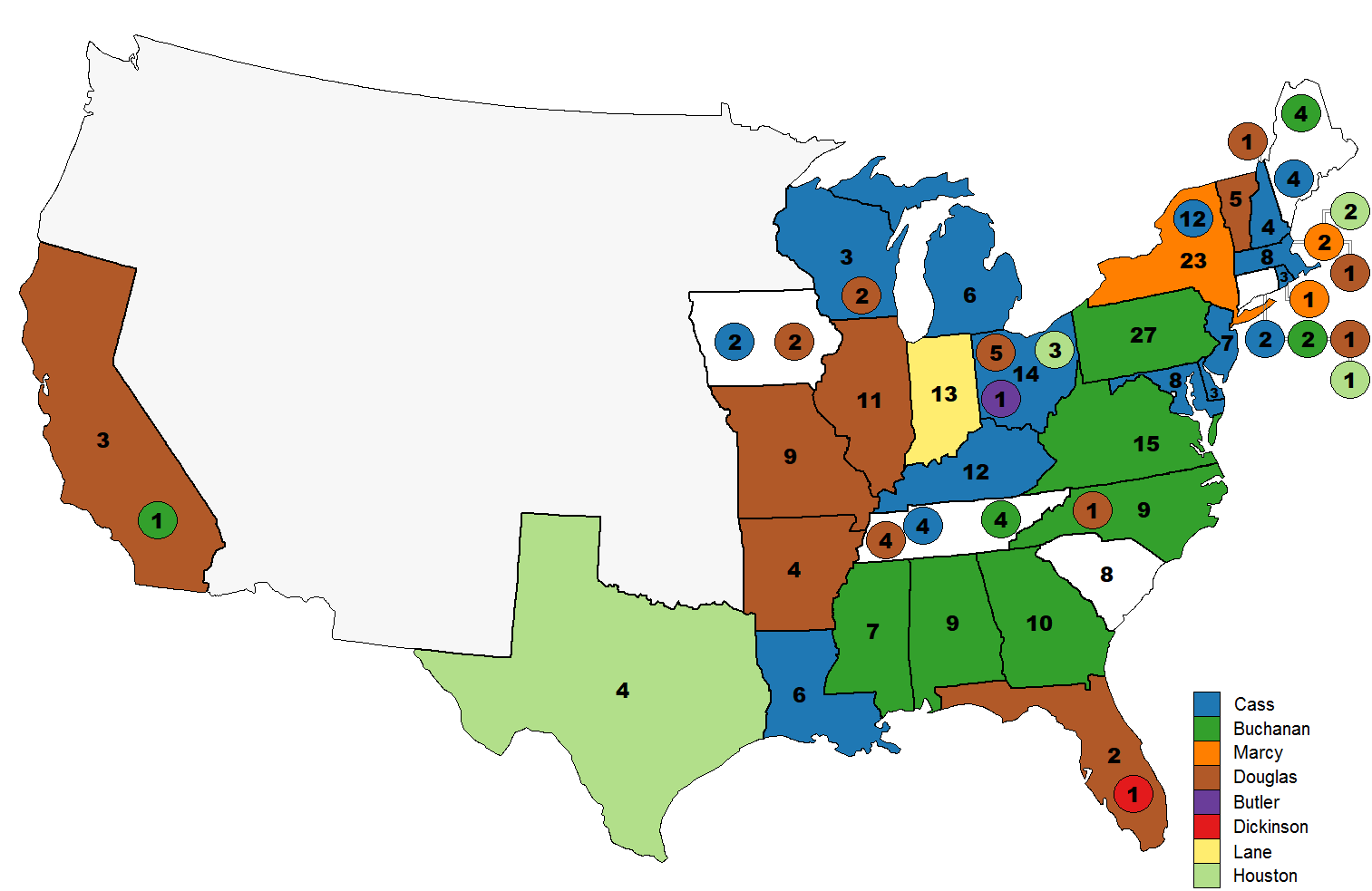
13th Ballot

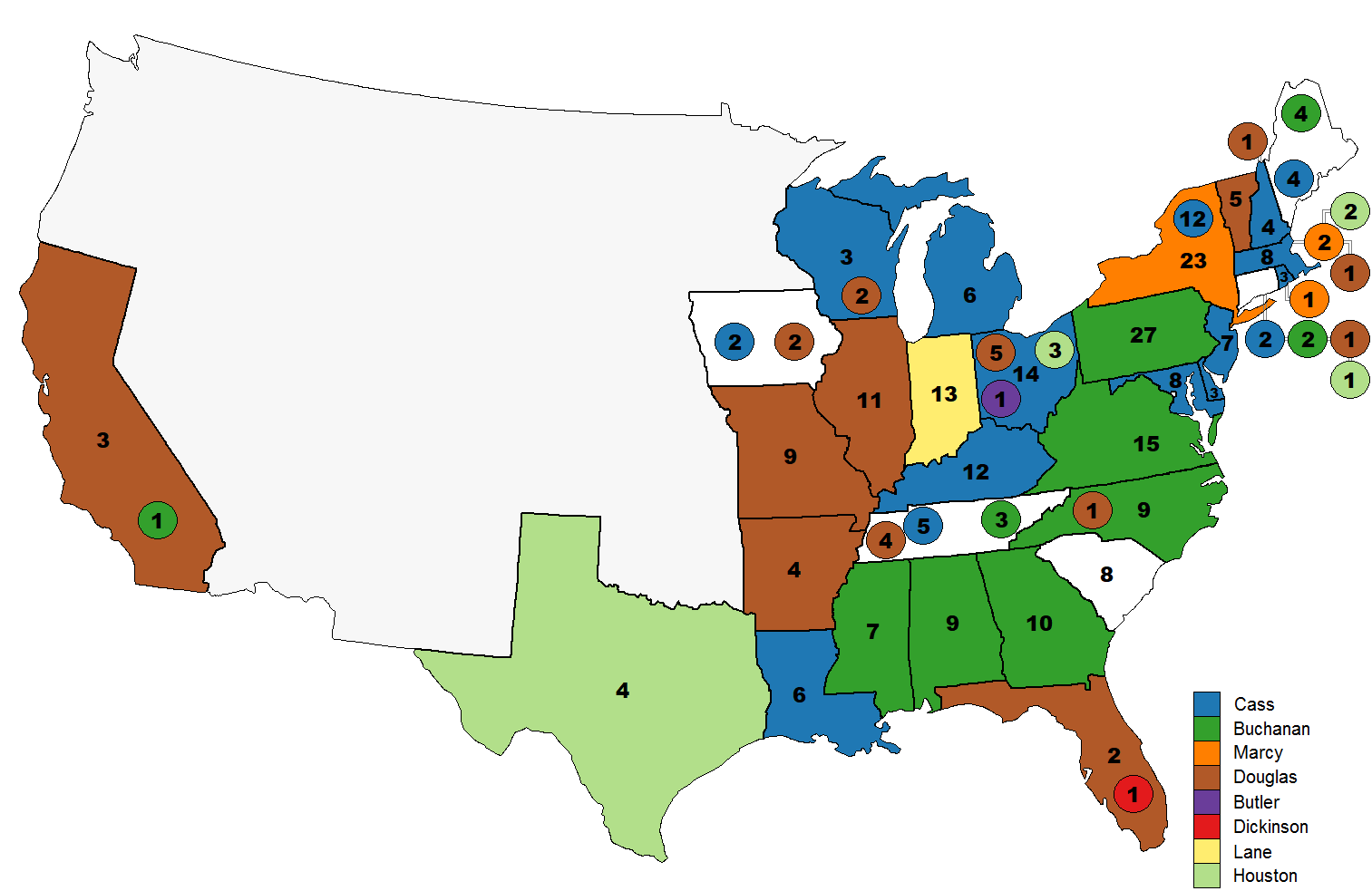
14th Ballot

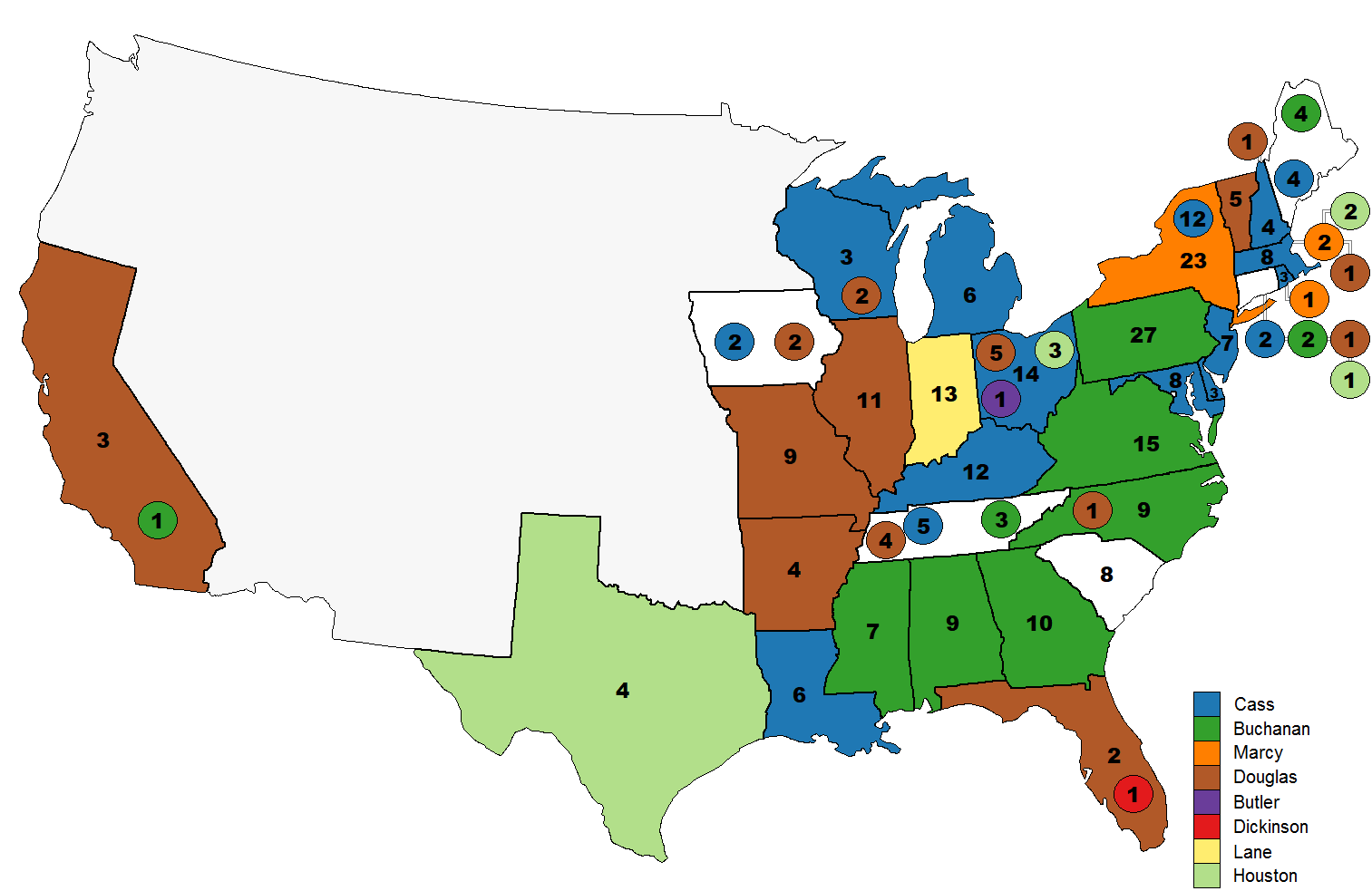
15th Ballot

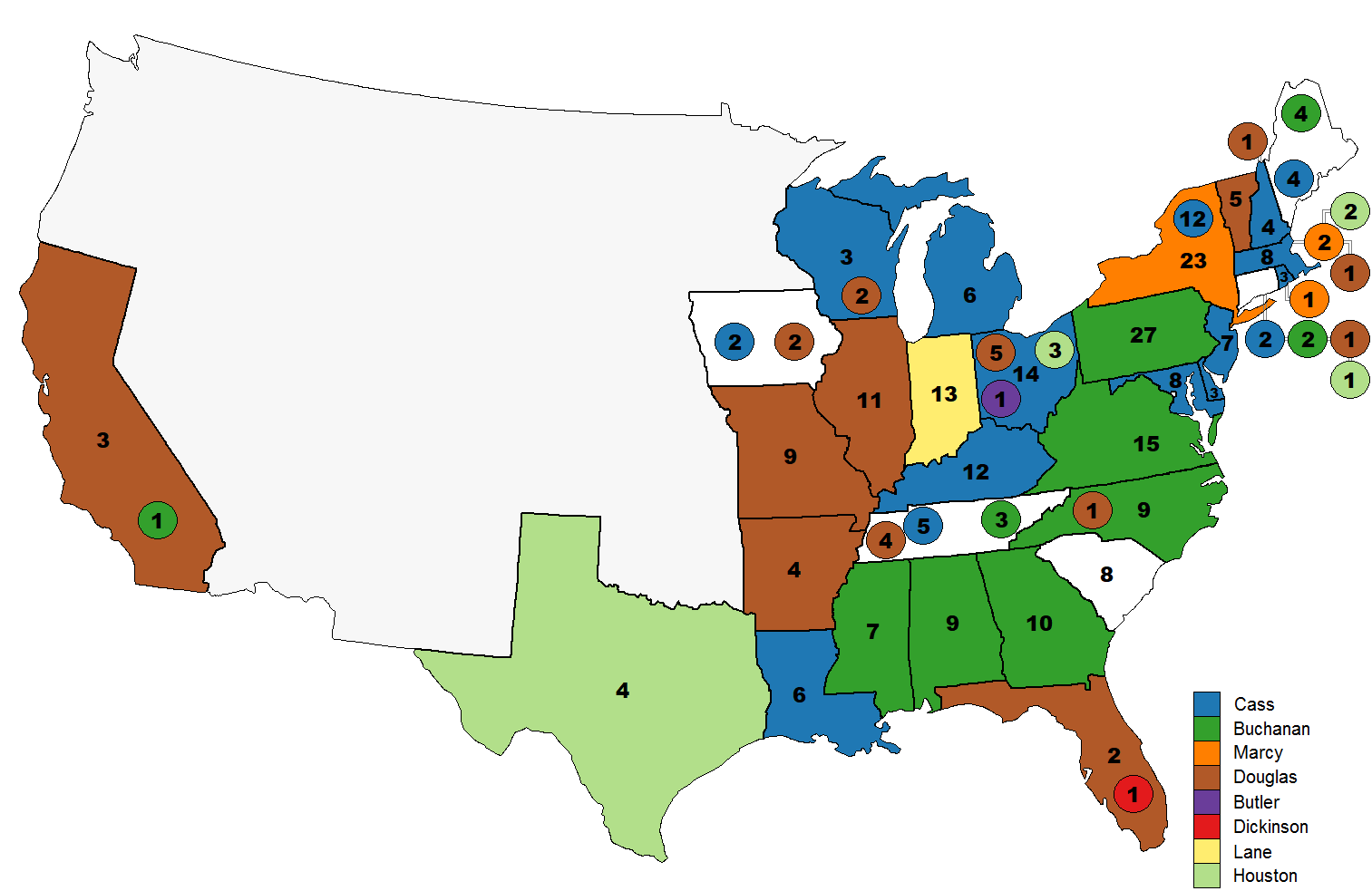
16th Ballot

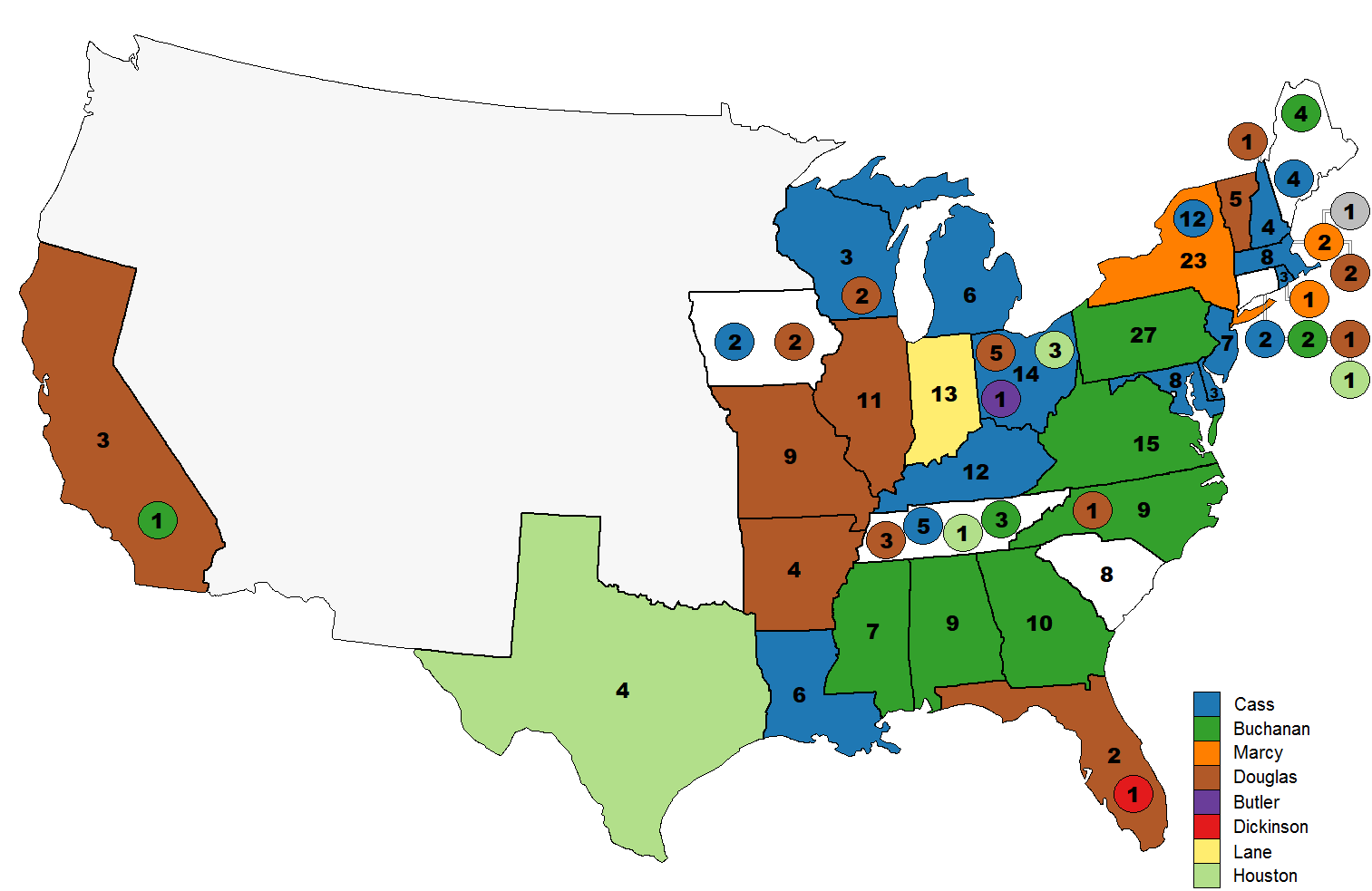
17th Ballot

2nd Day of Presidential Balloting / 4th Day of Convention (June 4, 1852)

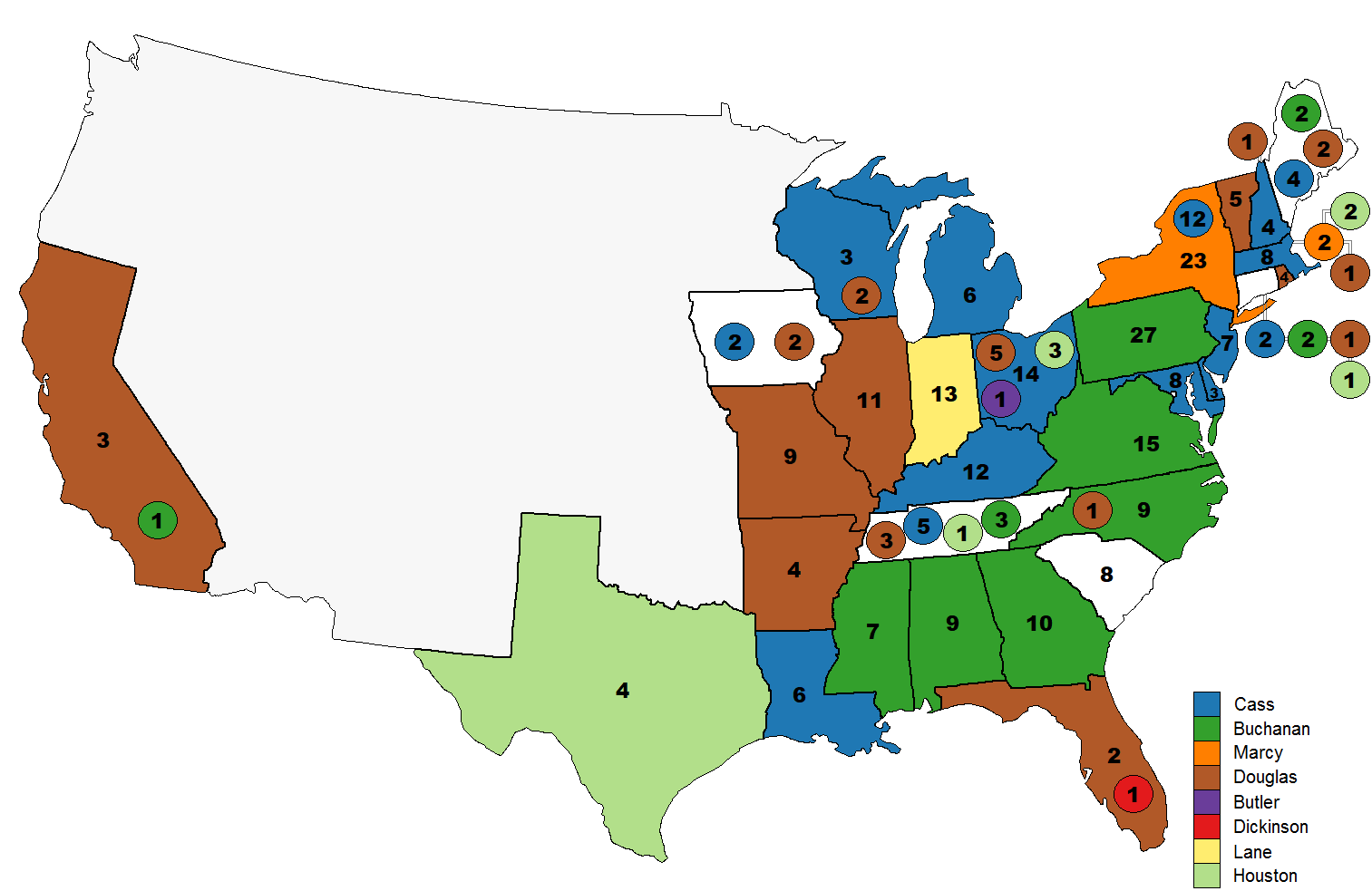
18th Ballot

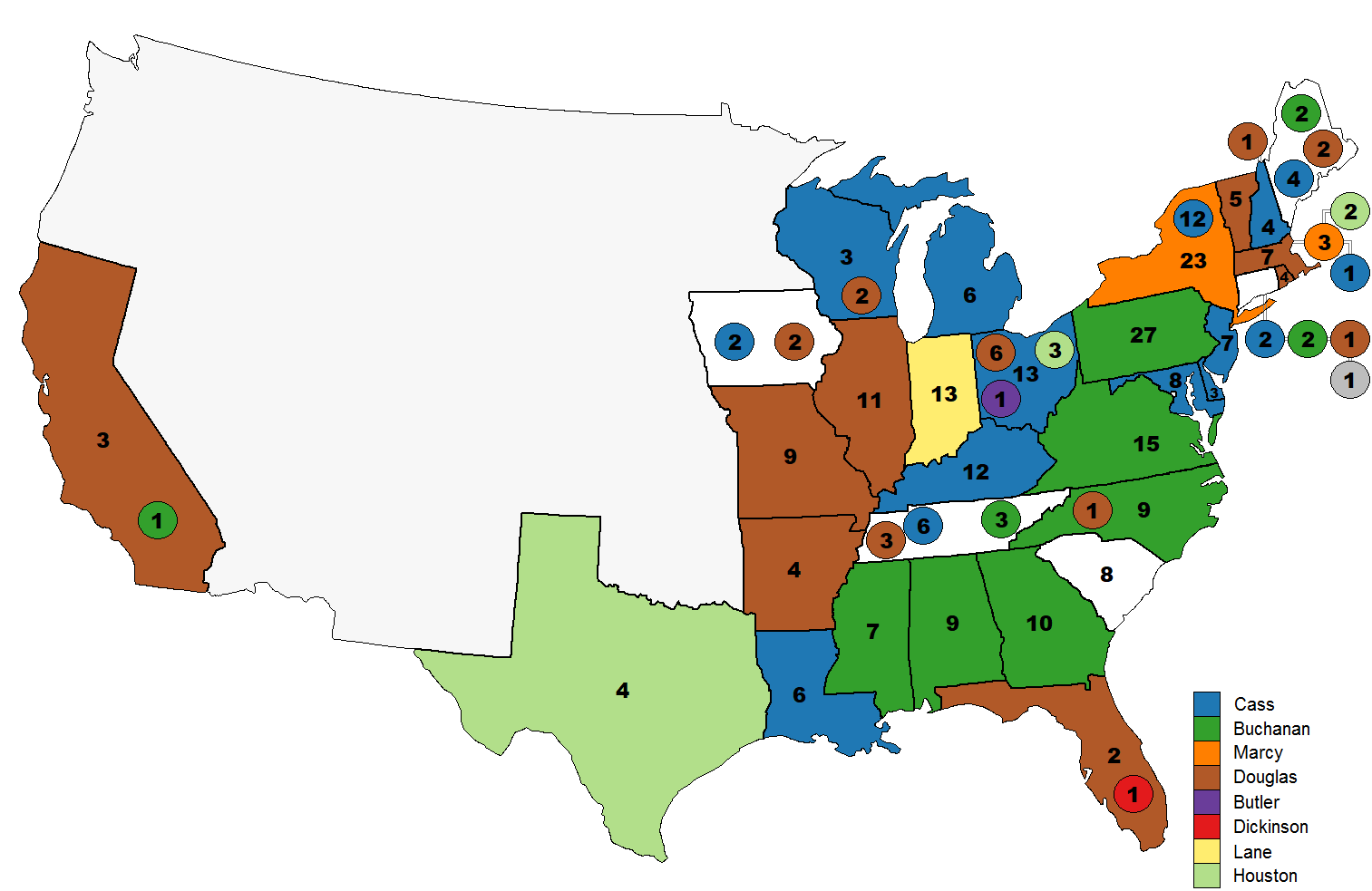
19th Ballot

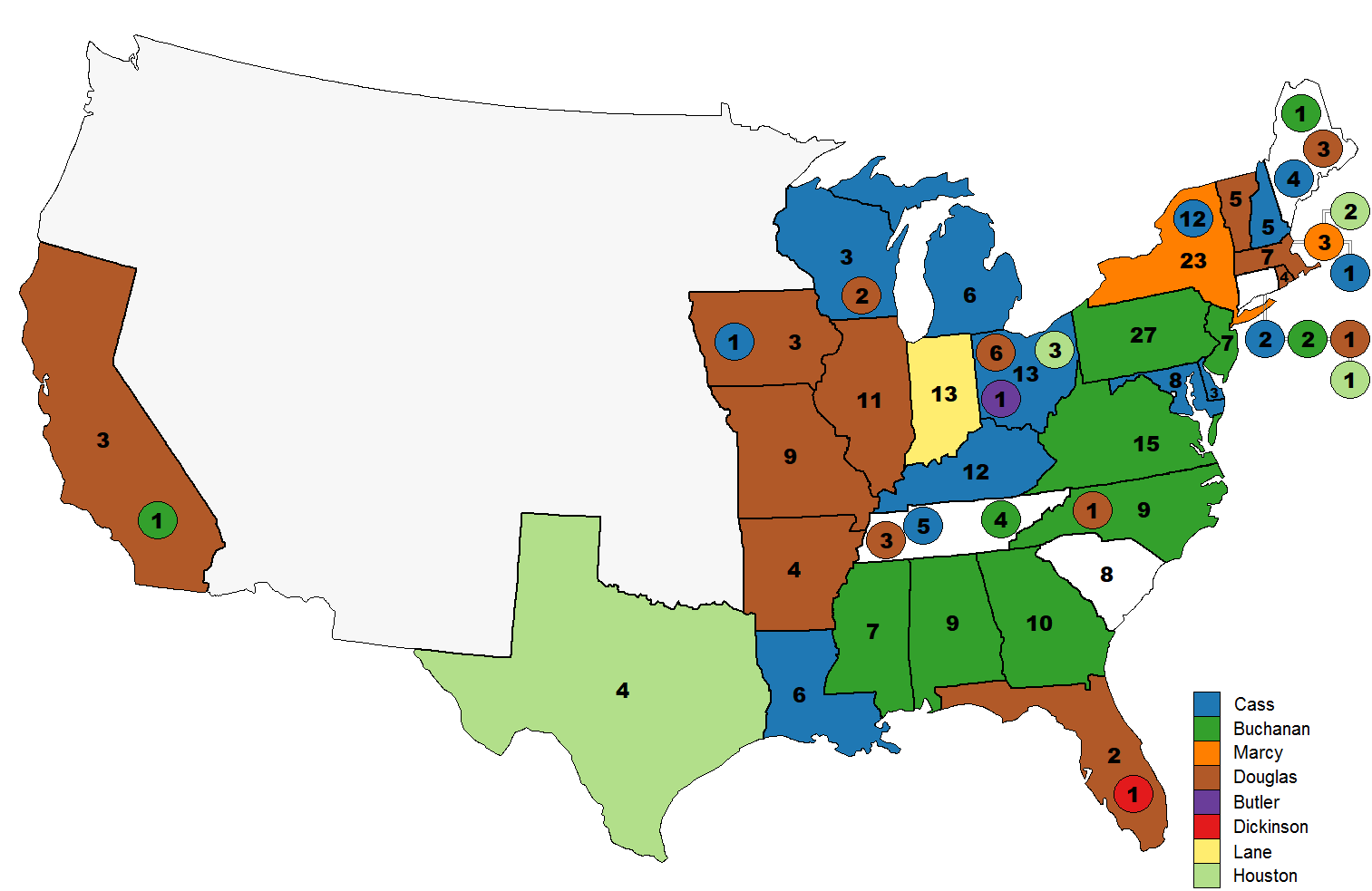
20th Ballot

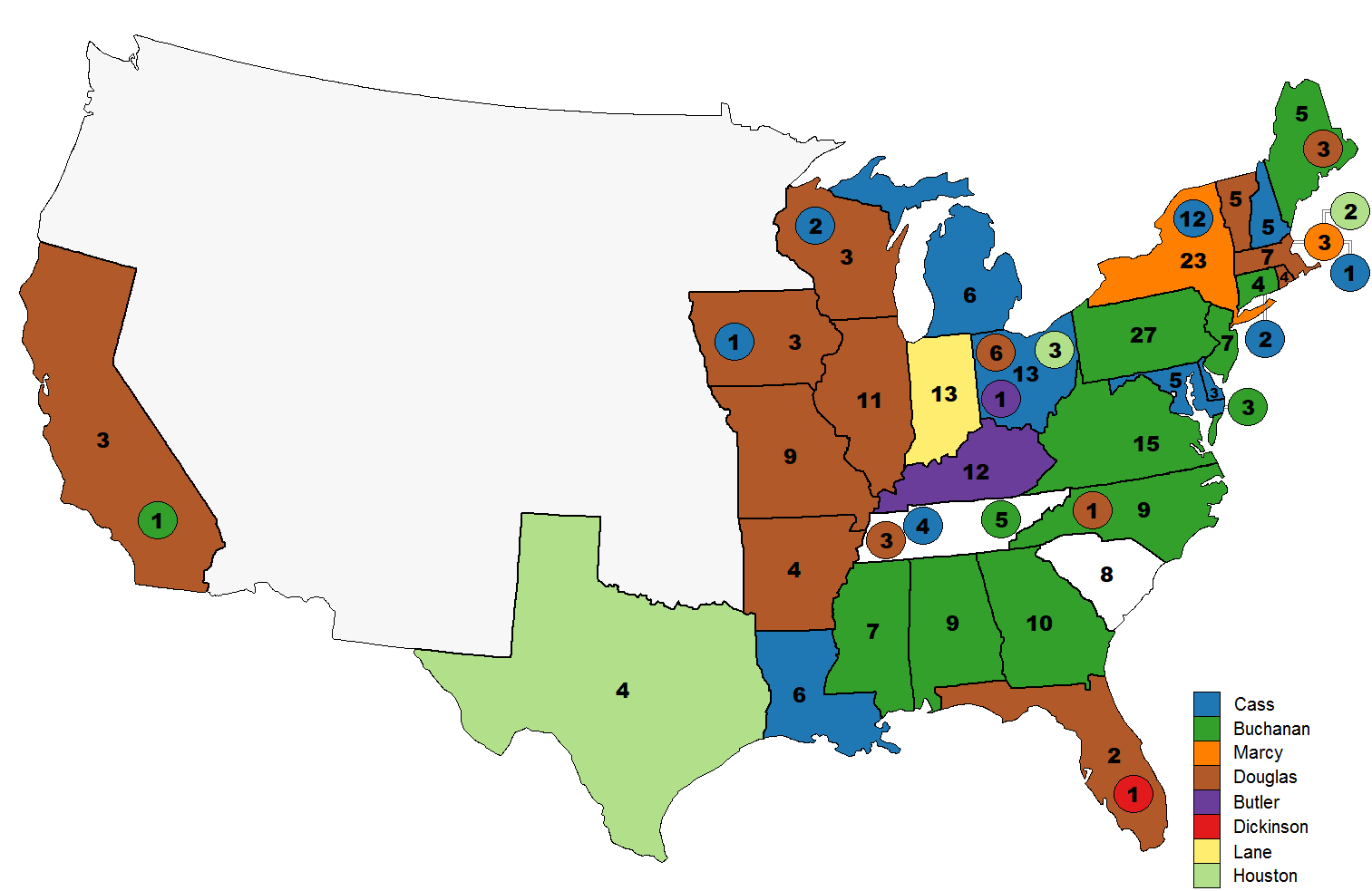
21st Ballot

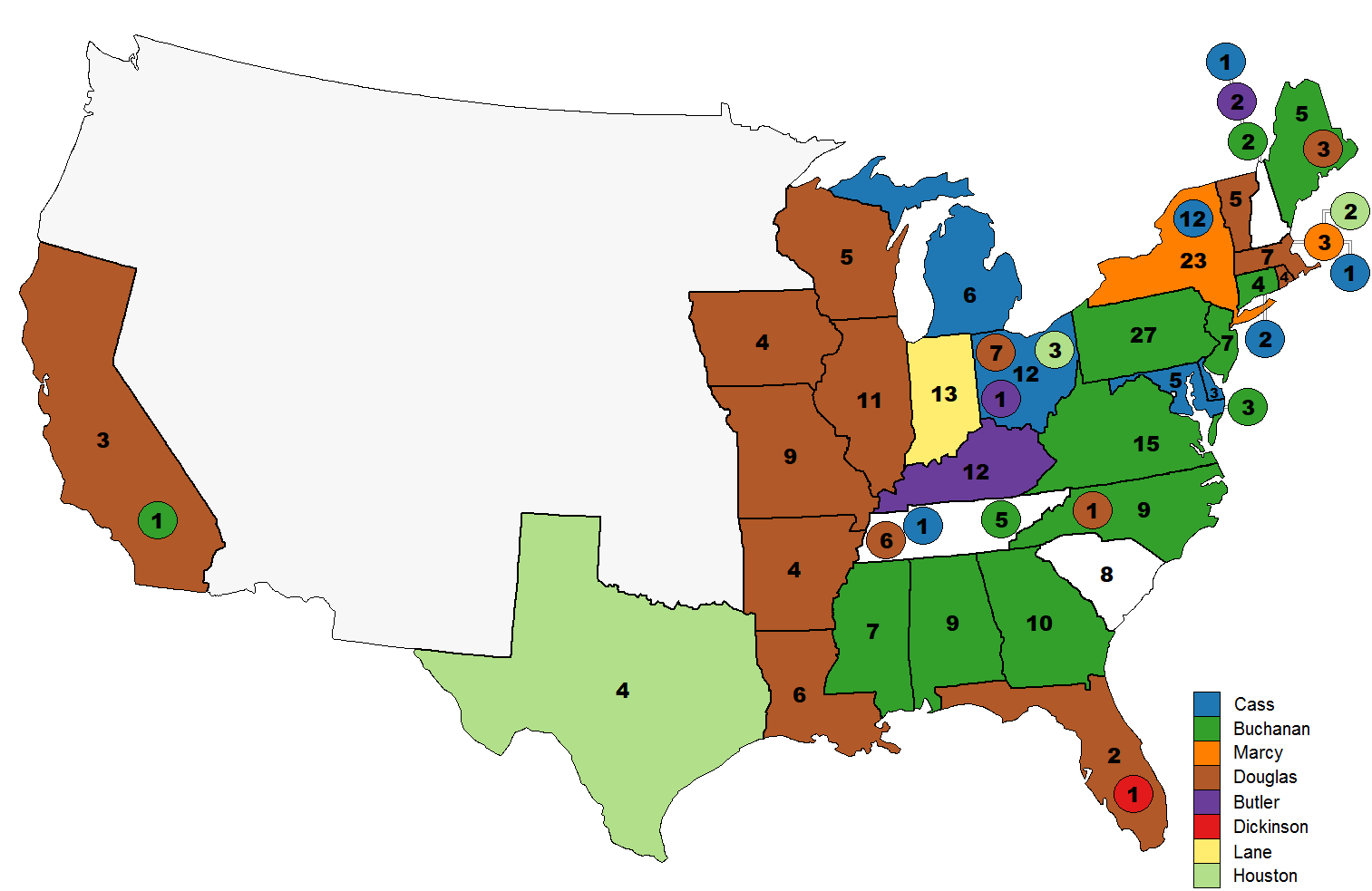
22nd Ballot
(Buchanan's Peak)

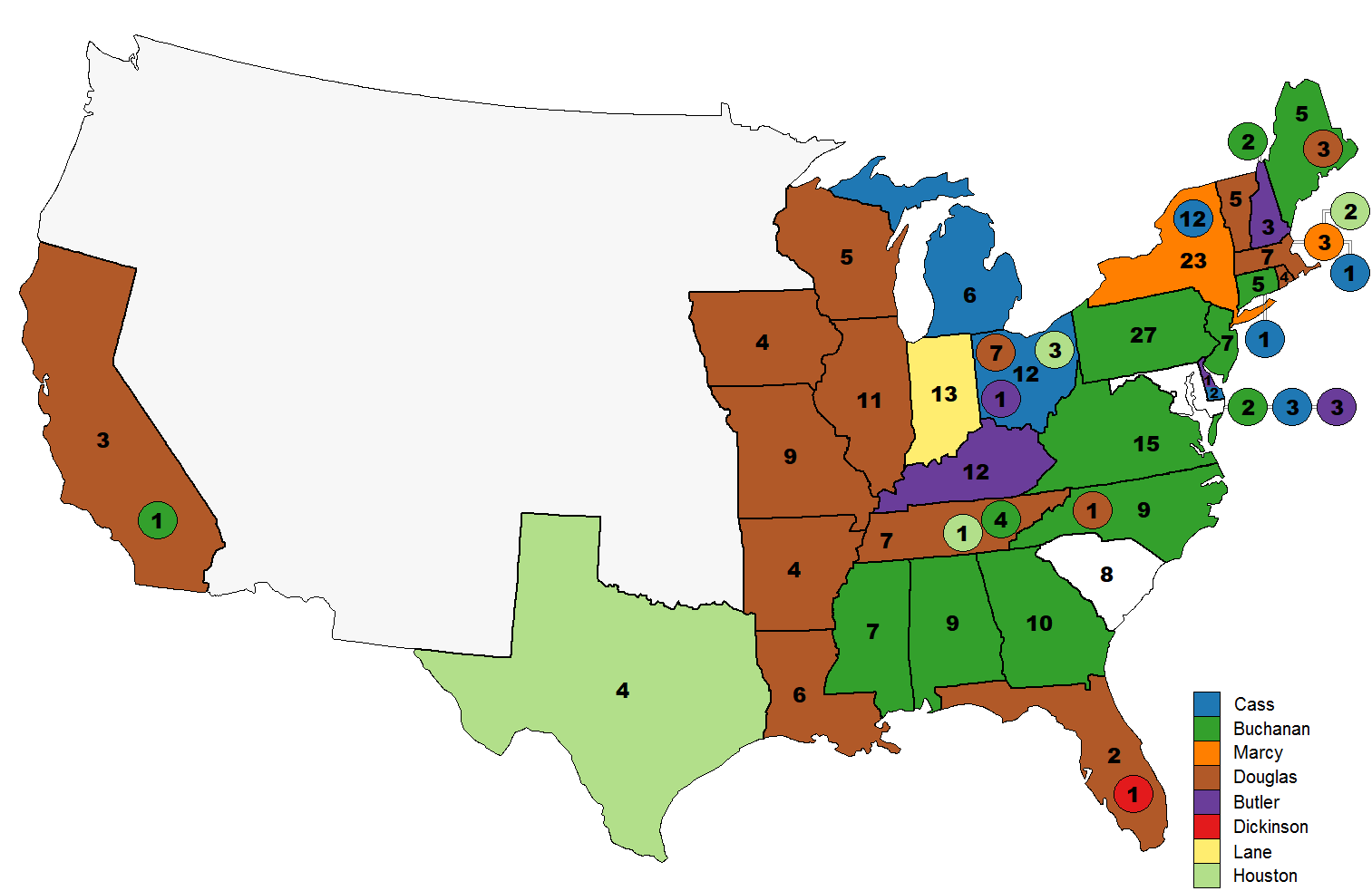
23rd Ballot

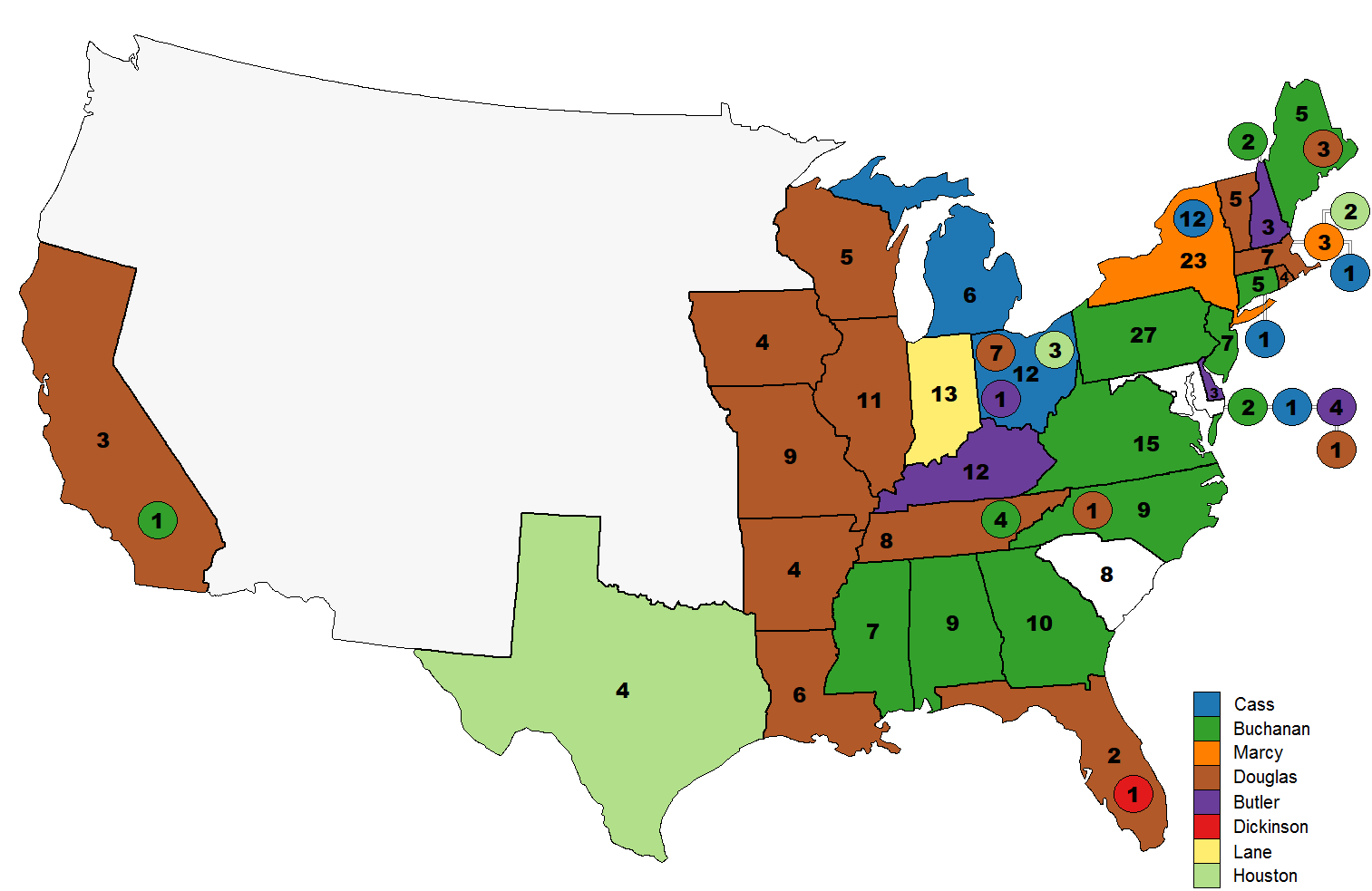
24th Ballot

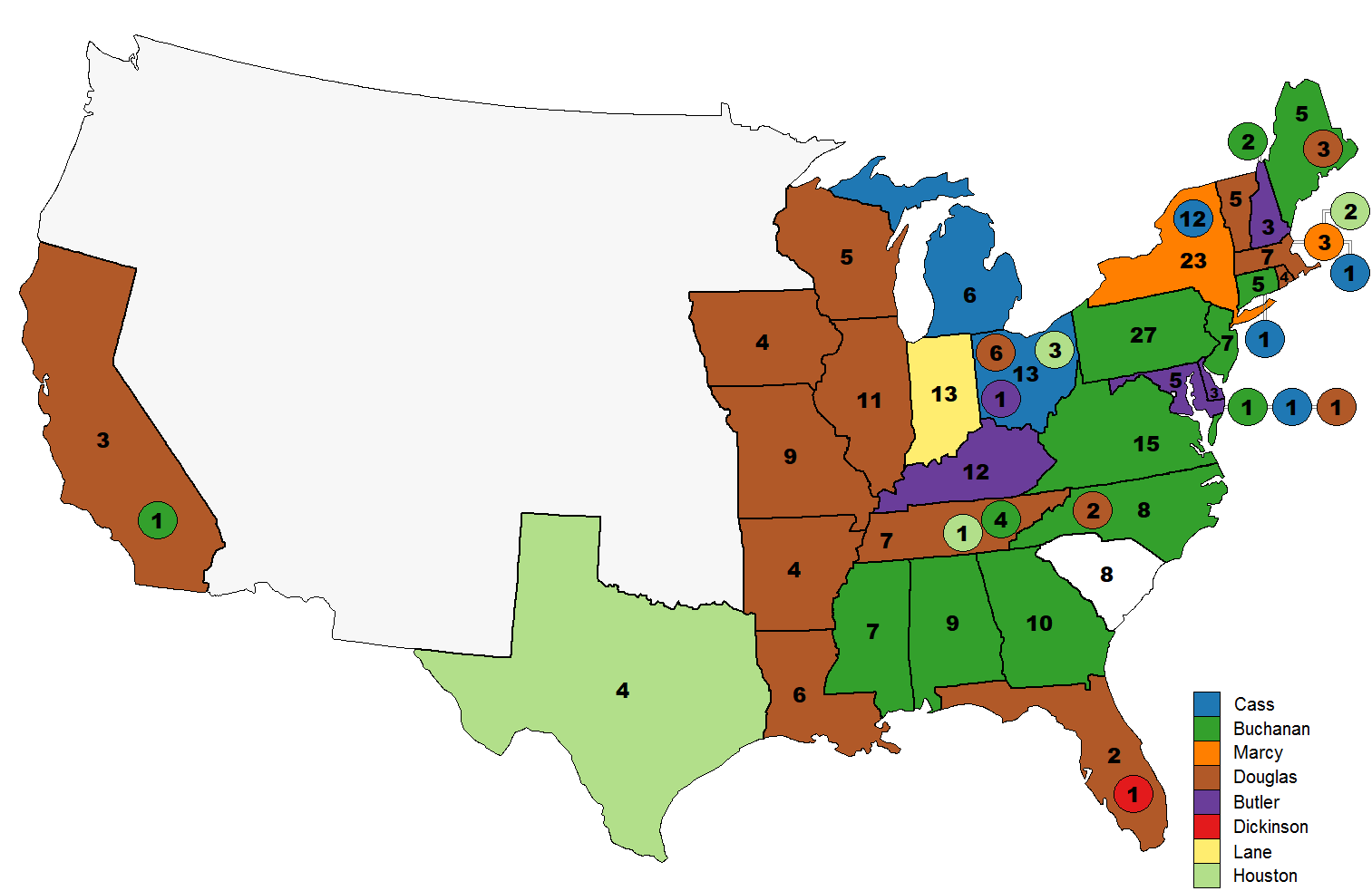
25th Ballot

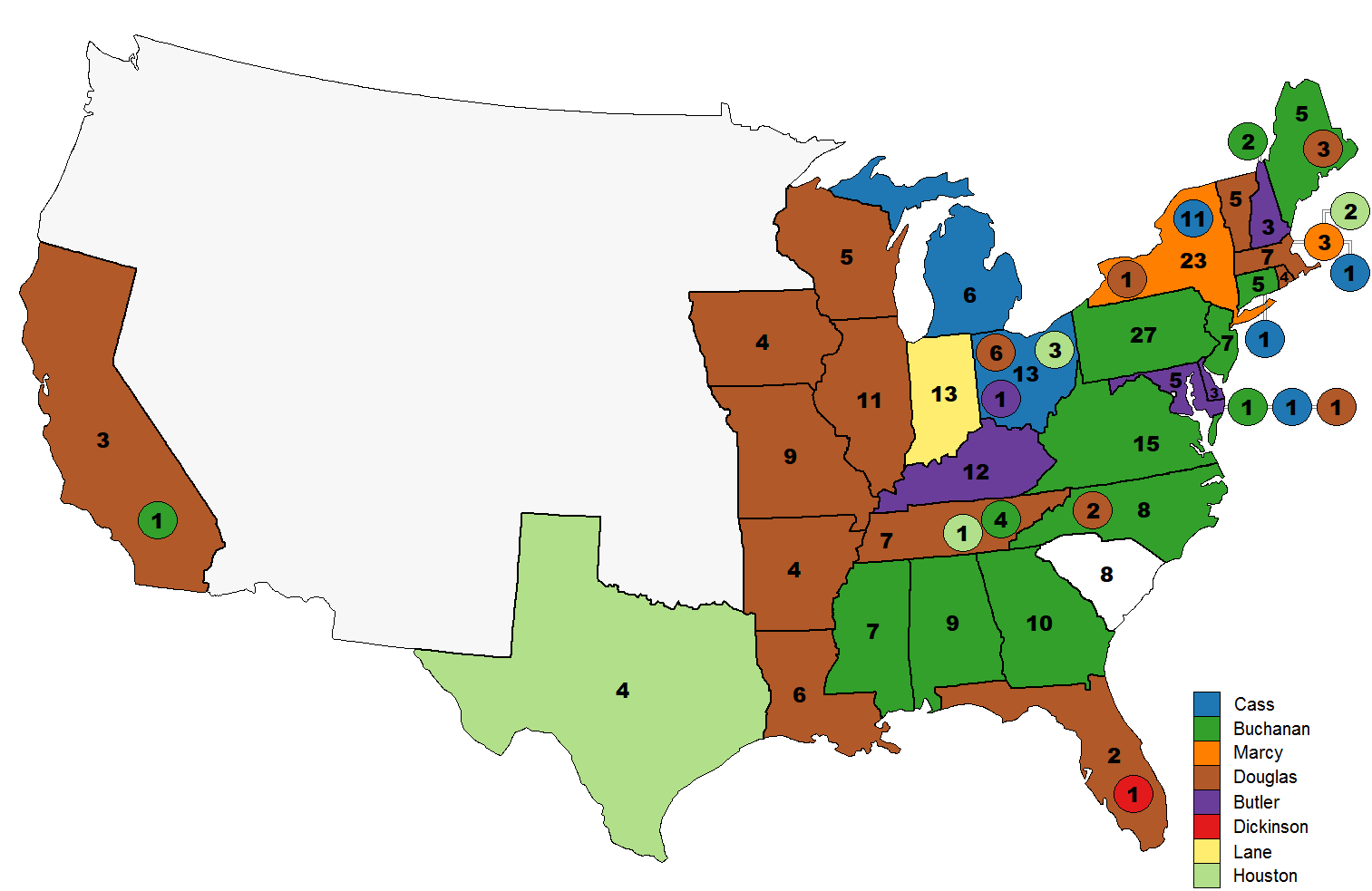
26th Ballot

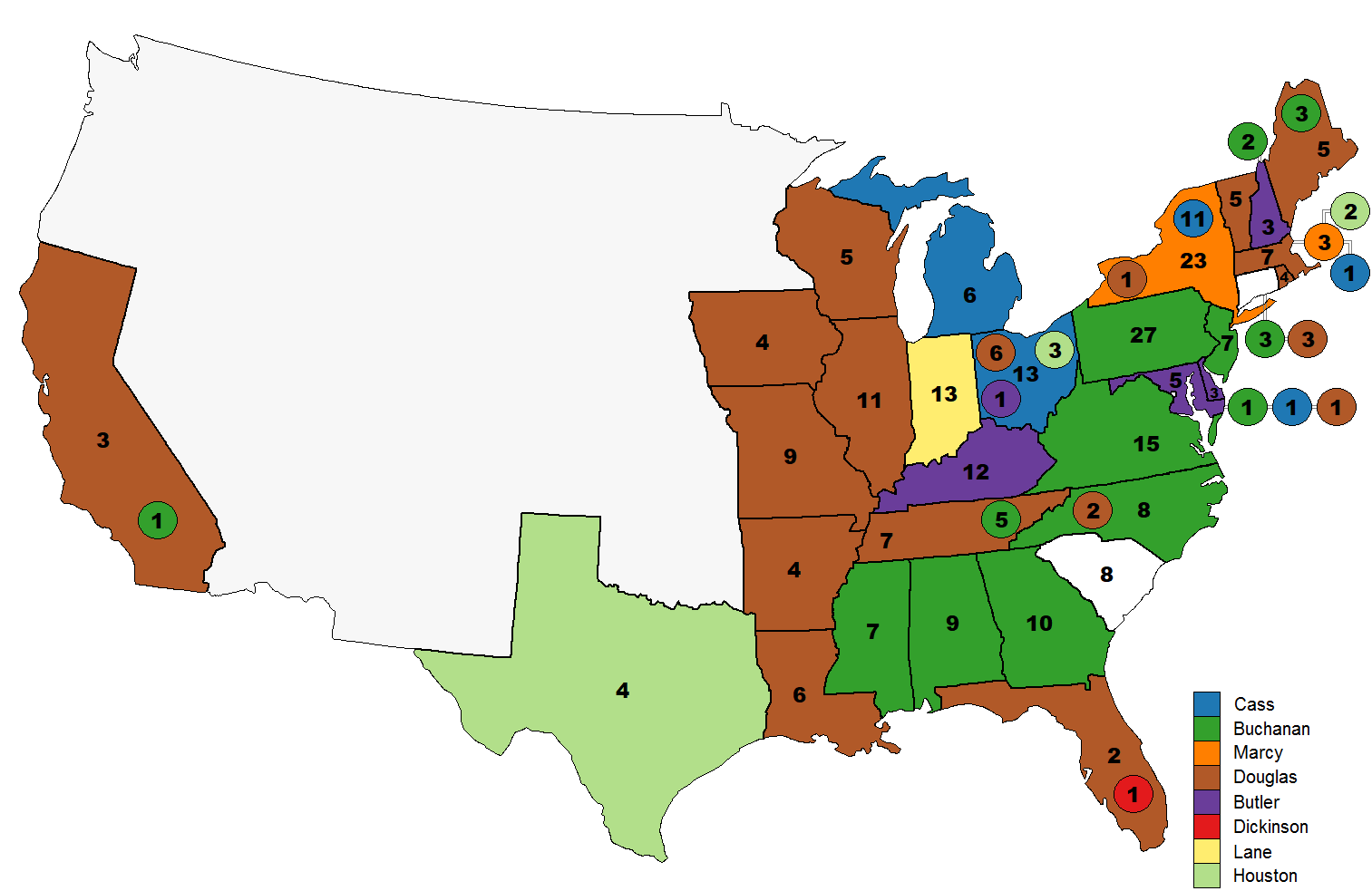
27th Ballot

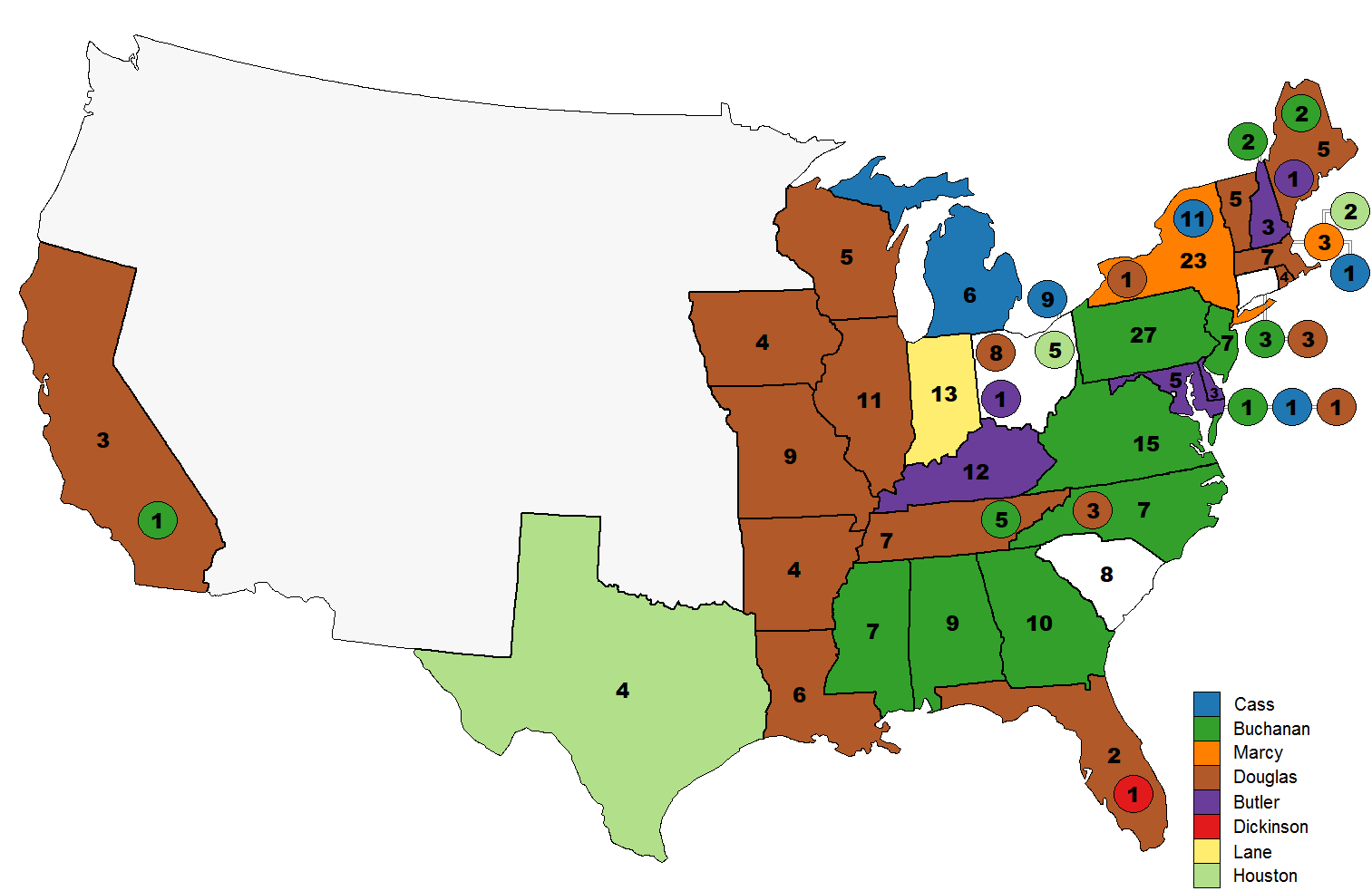
28th Ballot
(Butler's Peak)

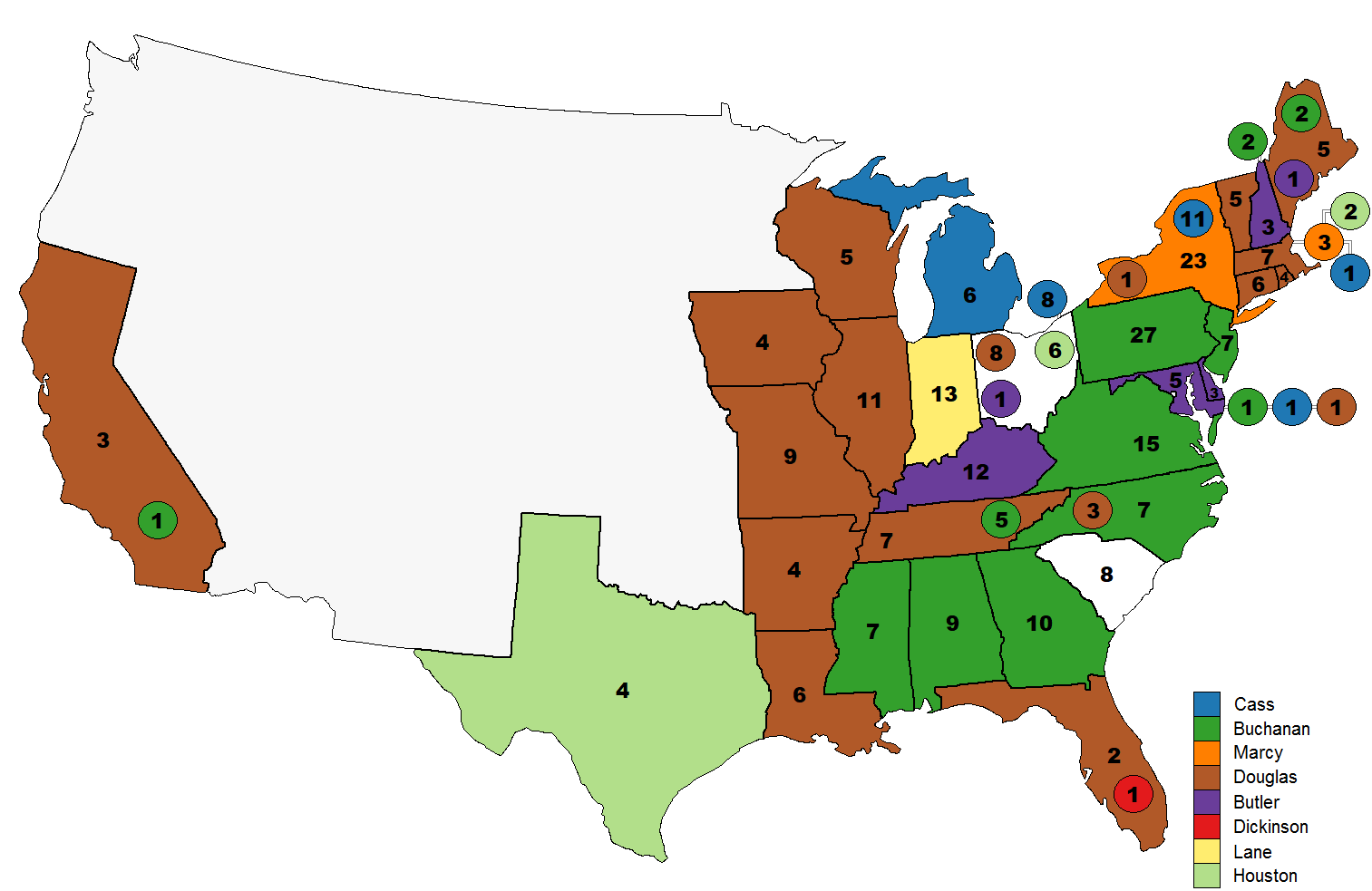
29th Ballot
(Butler's Peak)

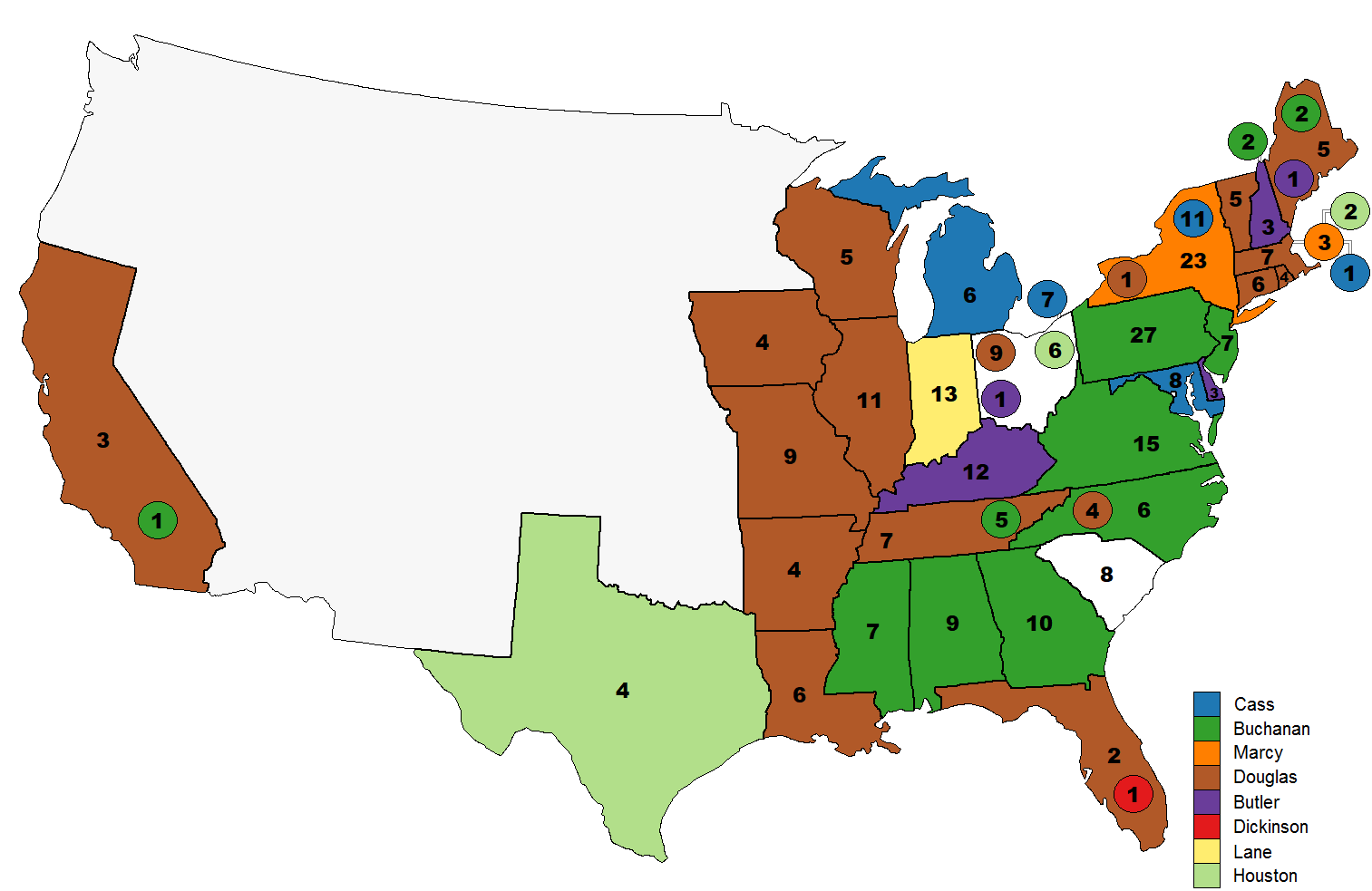
30th Ballot
(Douglas's Peak)

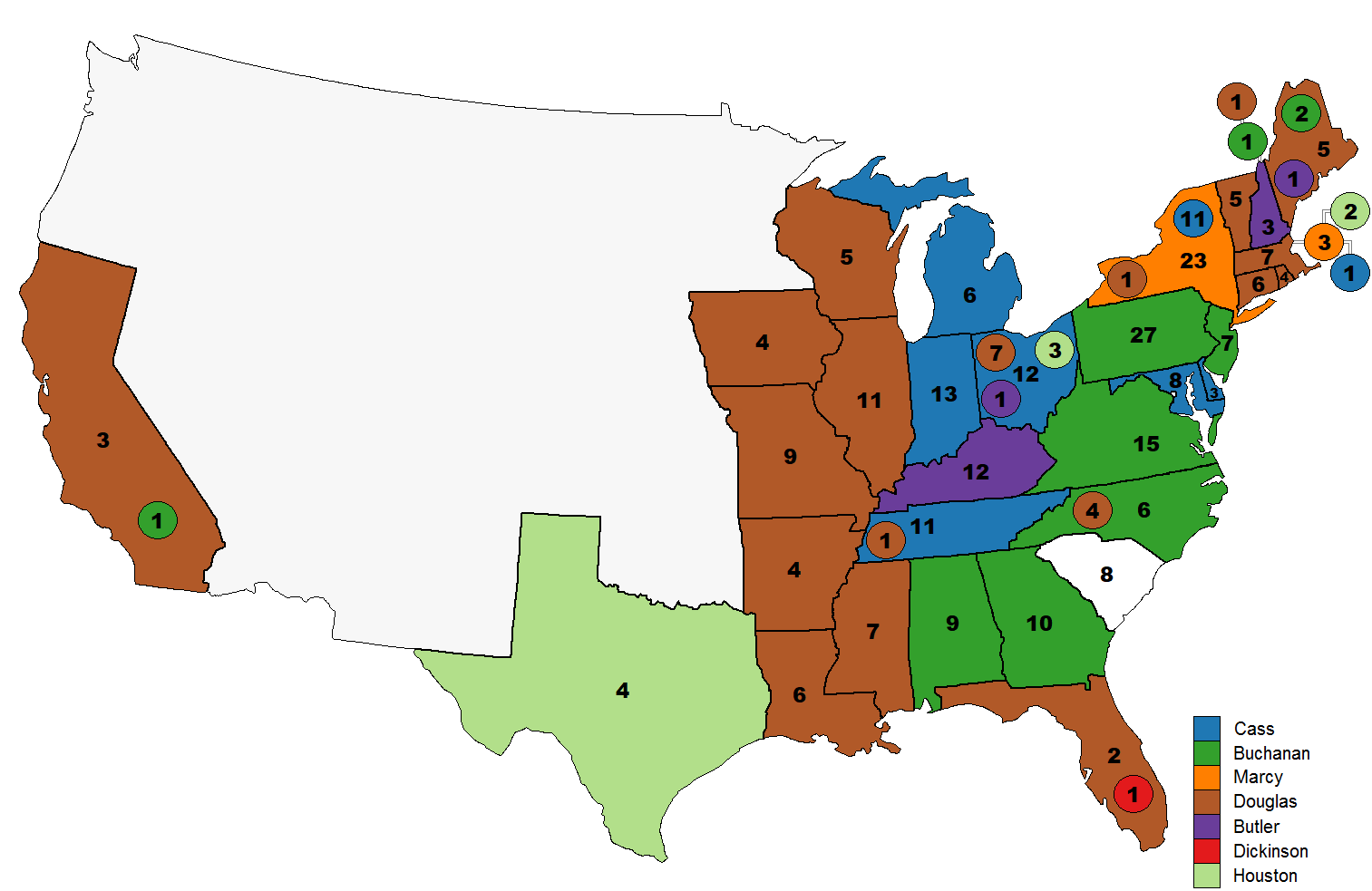
31st Ballot
(Douglas's Peak)

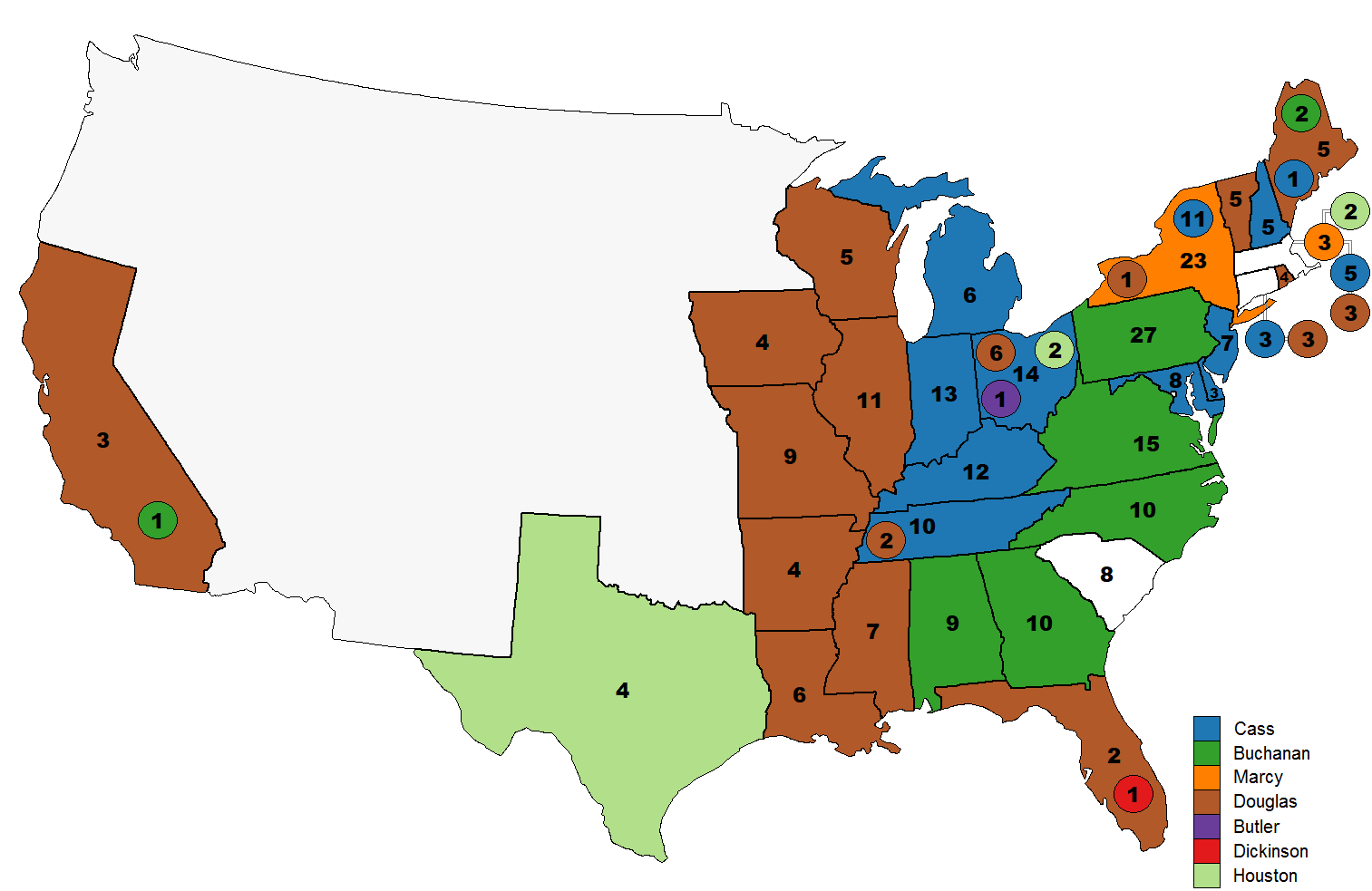
32nd Ballot

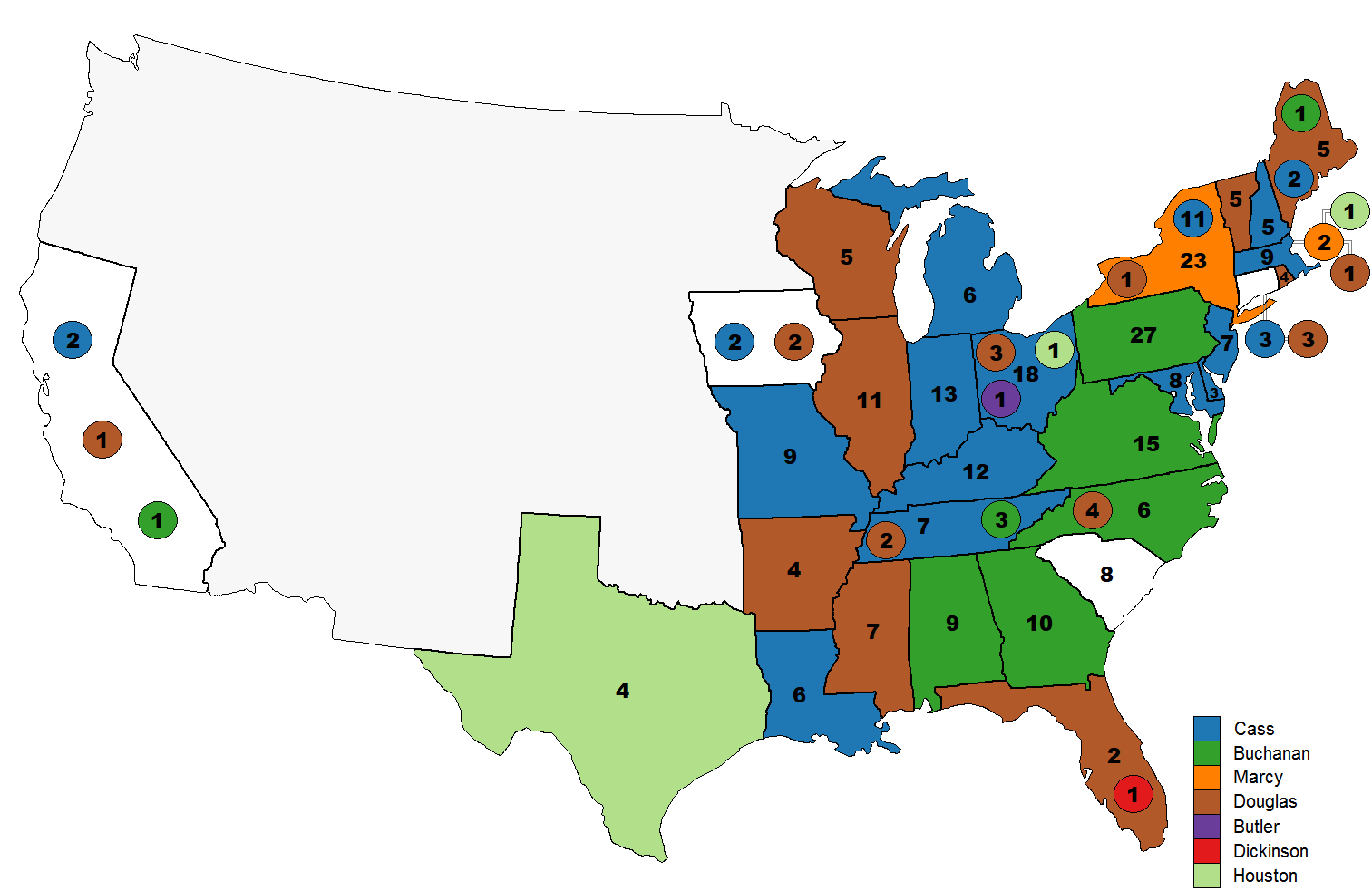
33rd Ballot

3rd Day of Presidential Balloting / 5th Day of Convention (June 5, 1852)

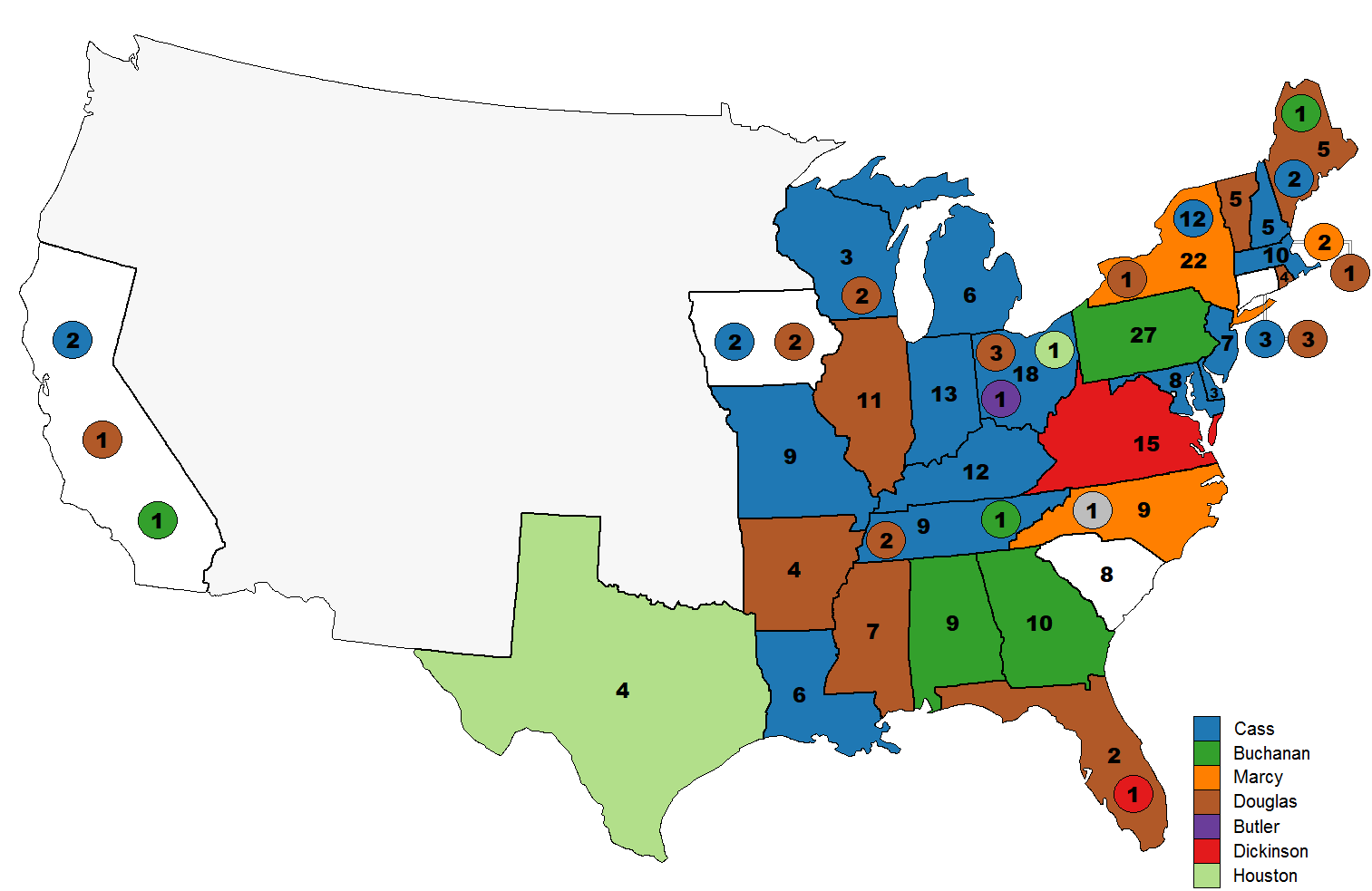
34th Ballot

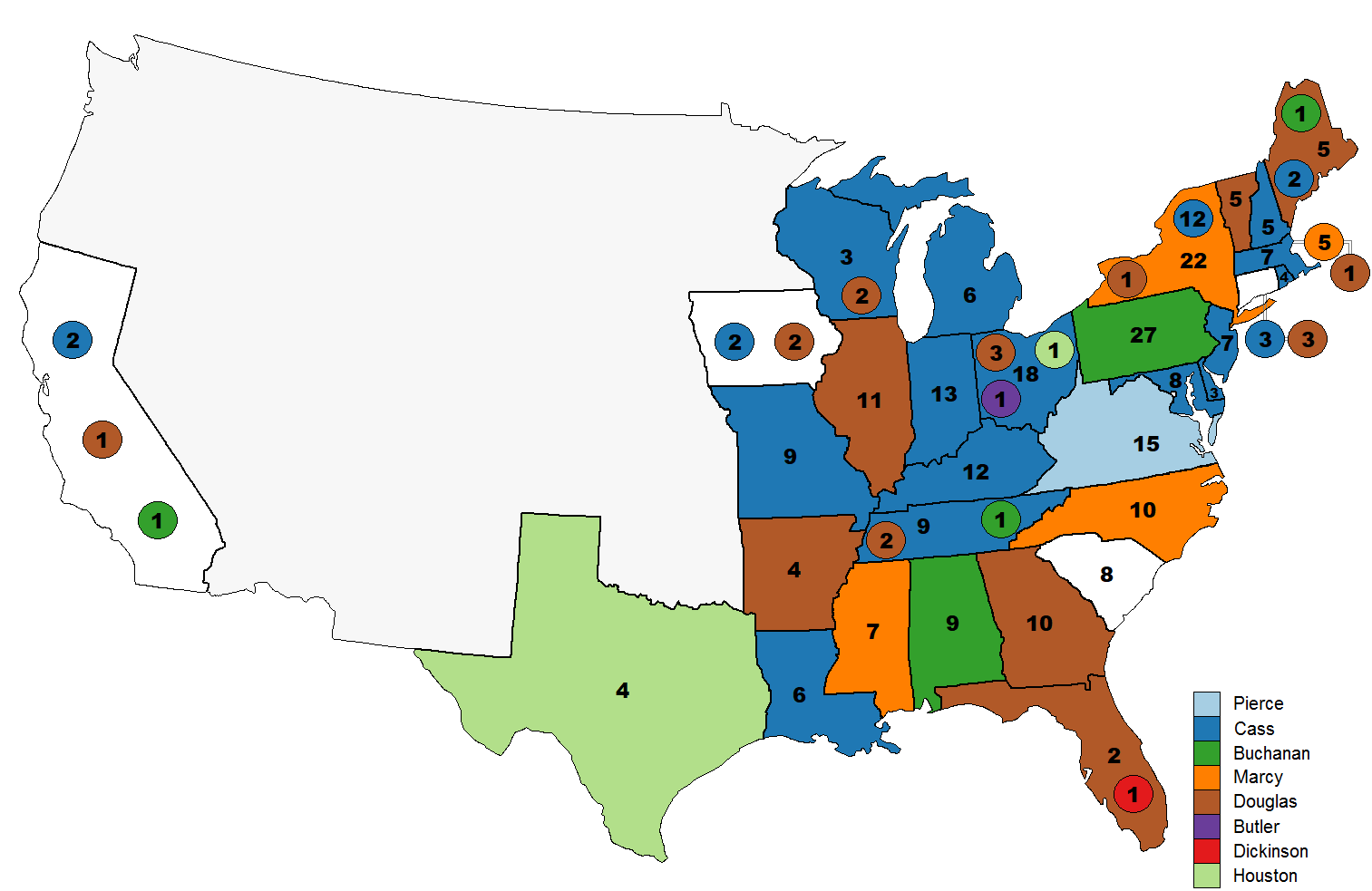
35th Ballot
(Cass's 2nd Peak)

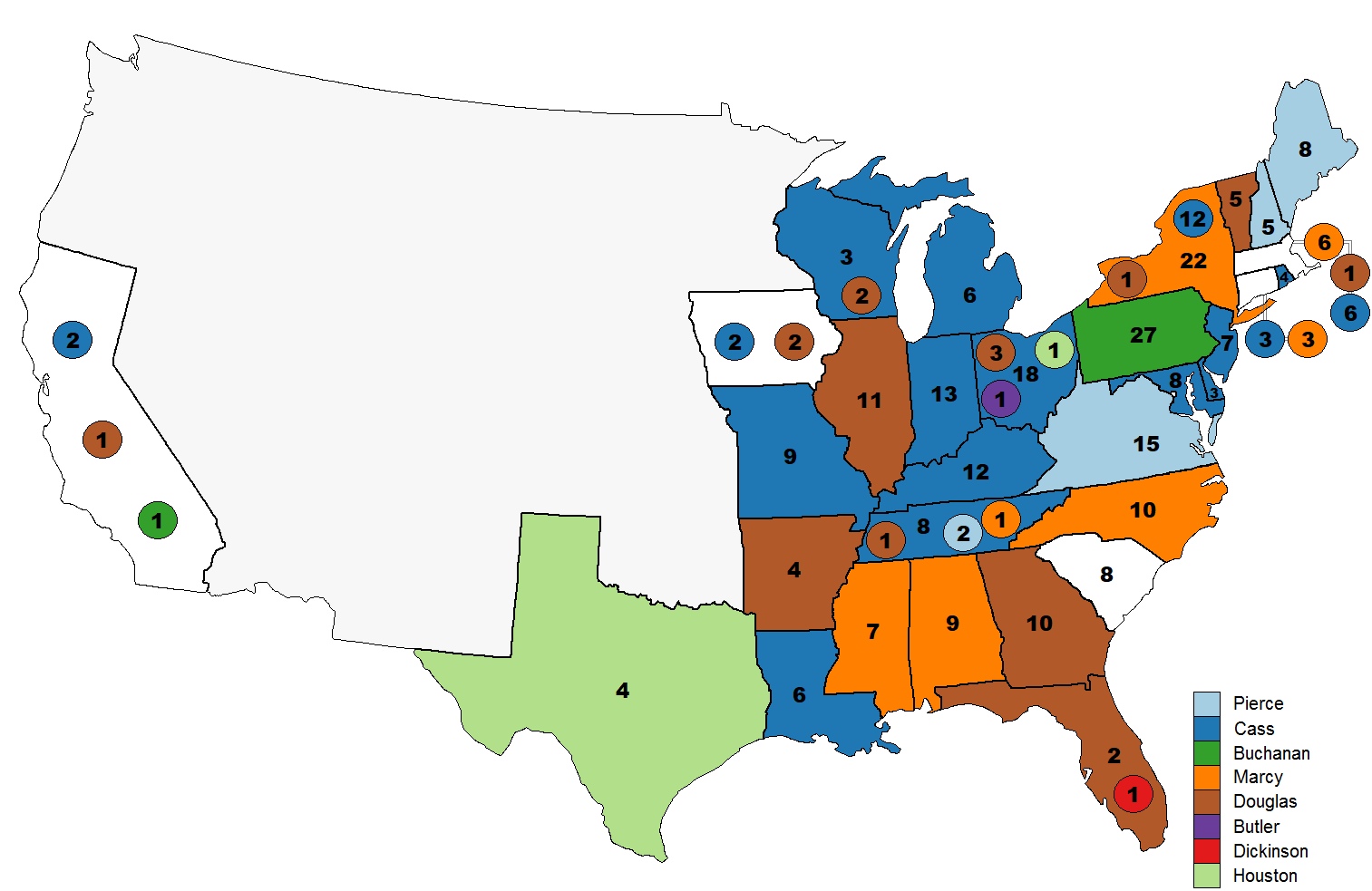
36th Ballot

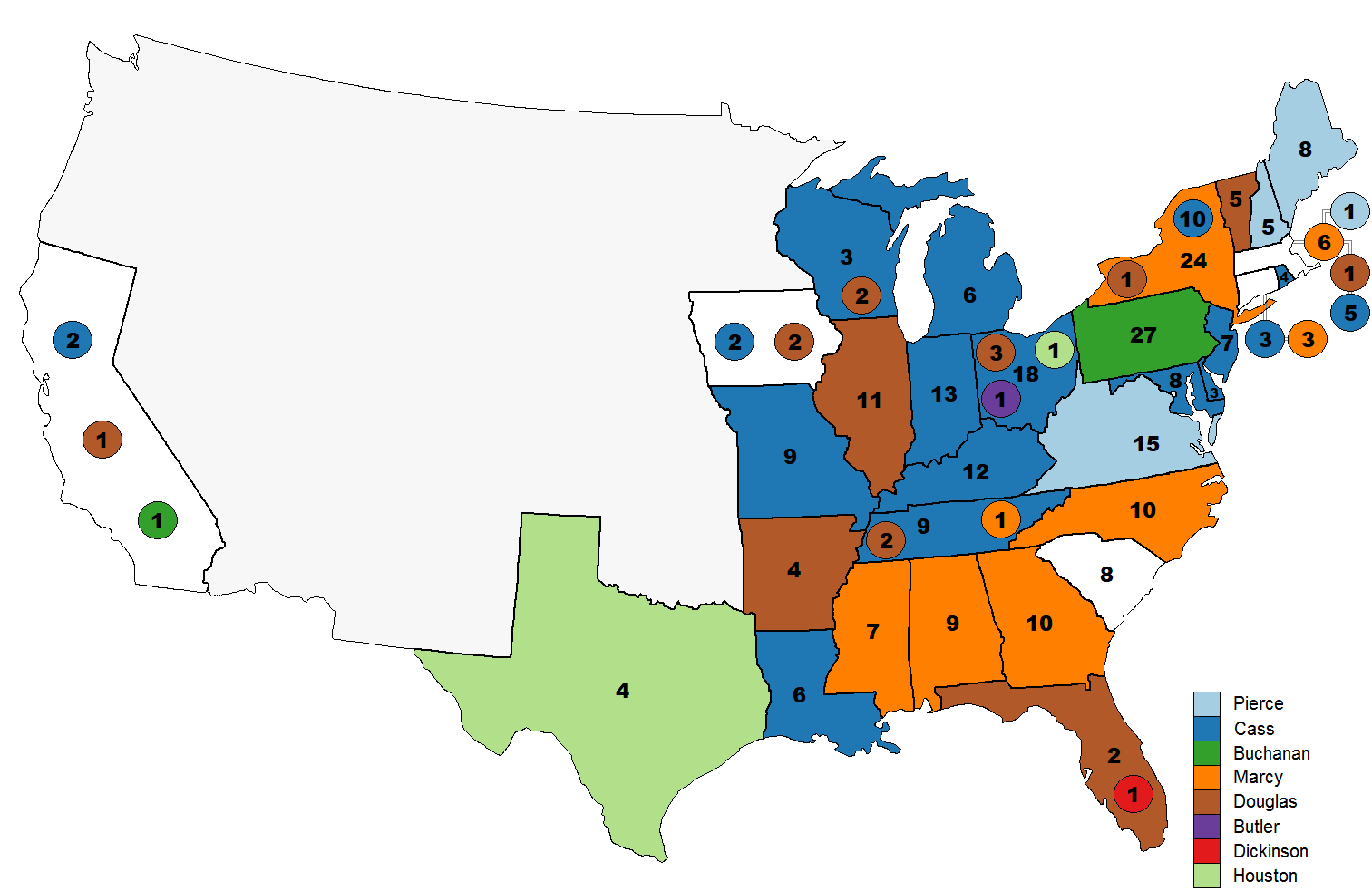
37th Ballot

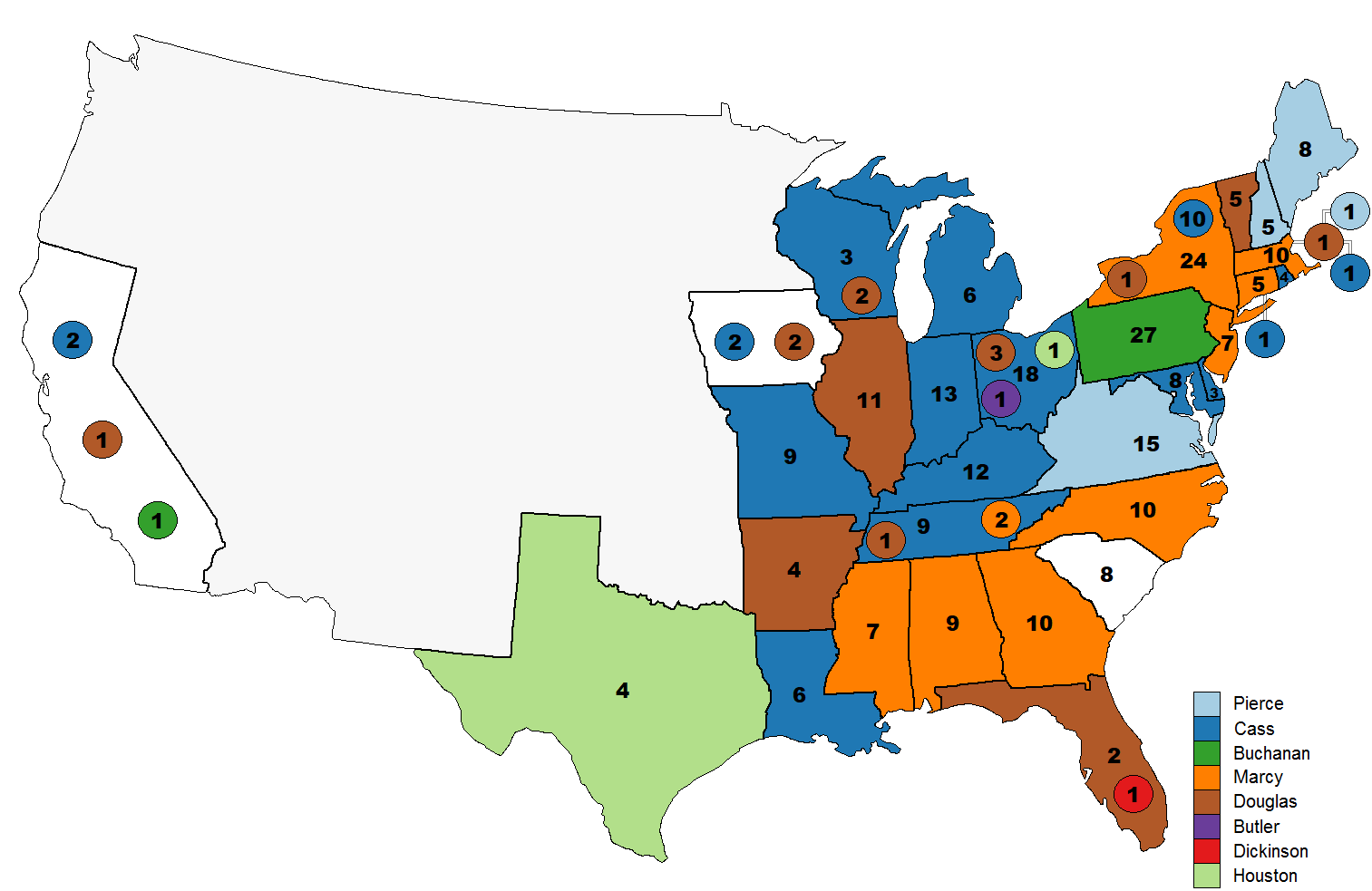
38th Ballot

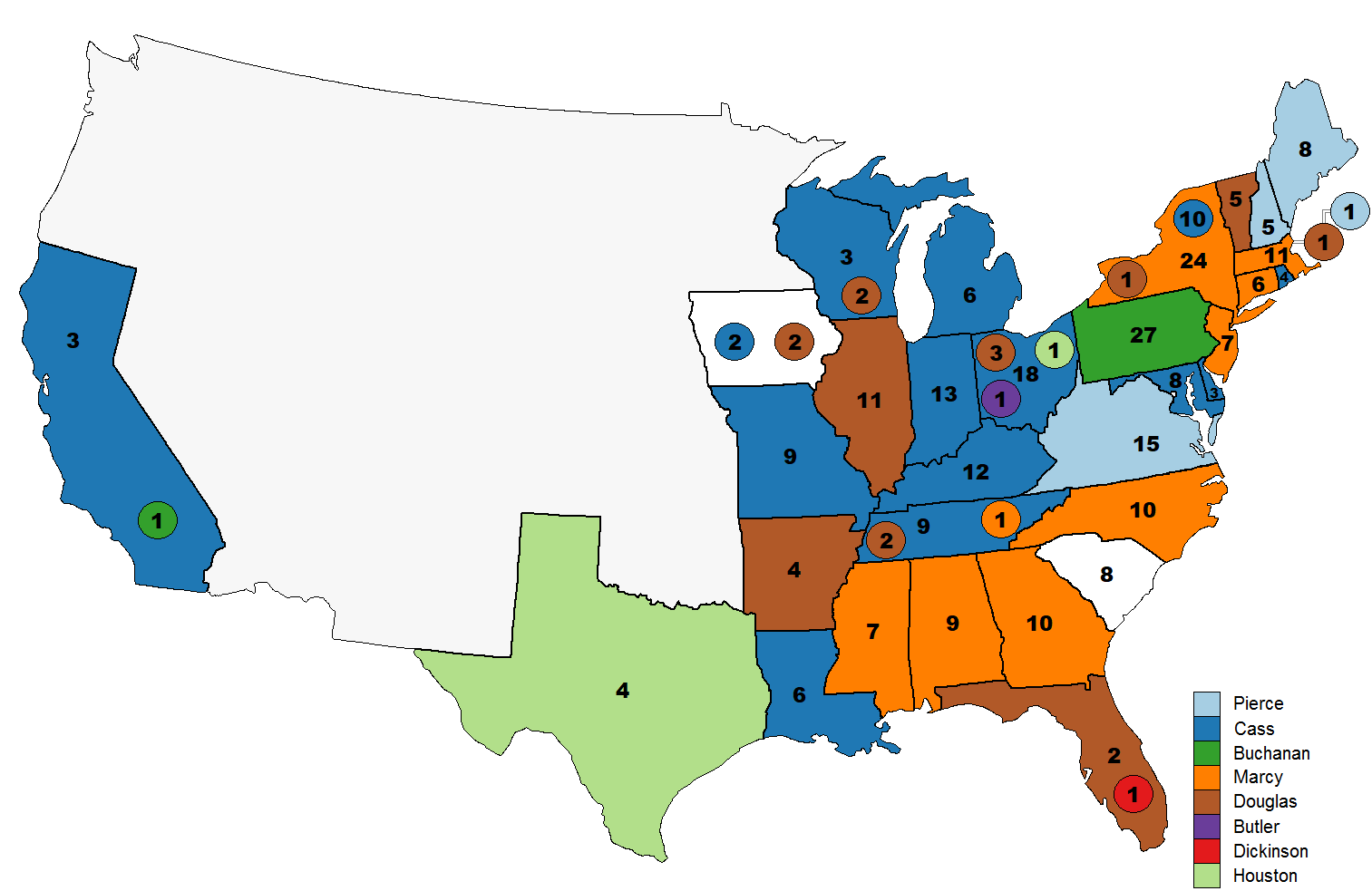
39th Ballot

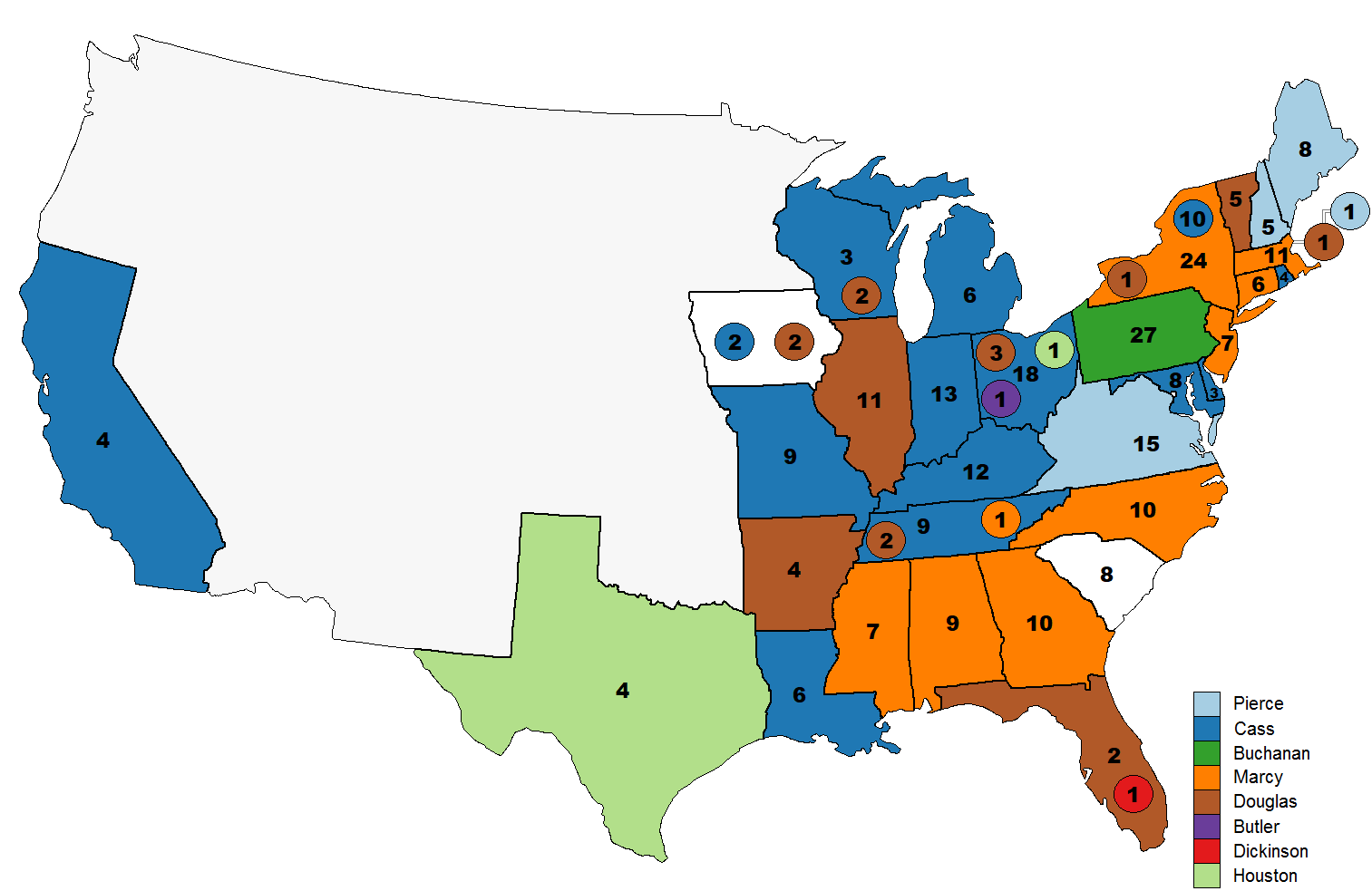
40th Ballot

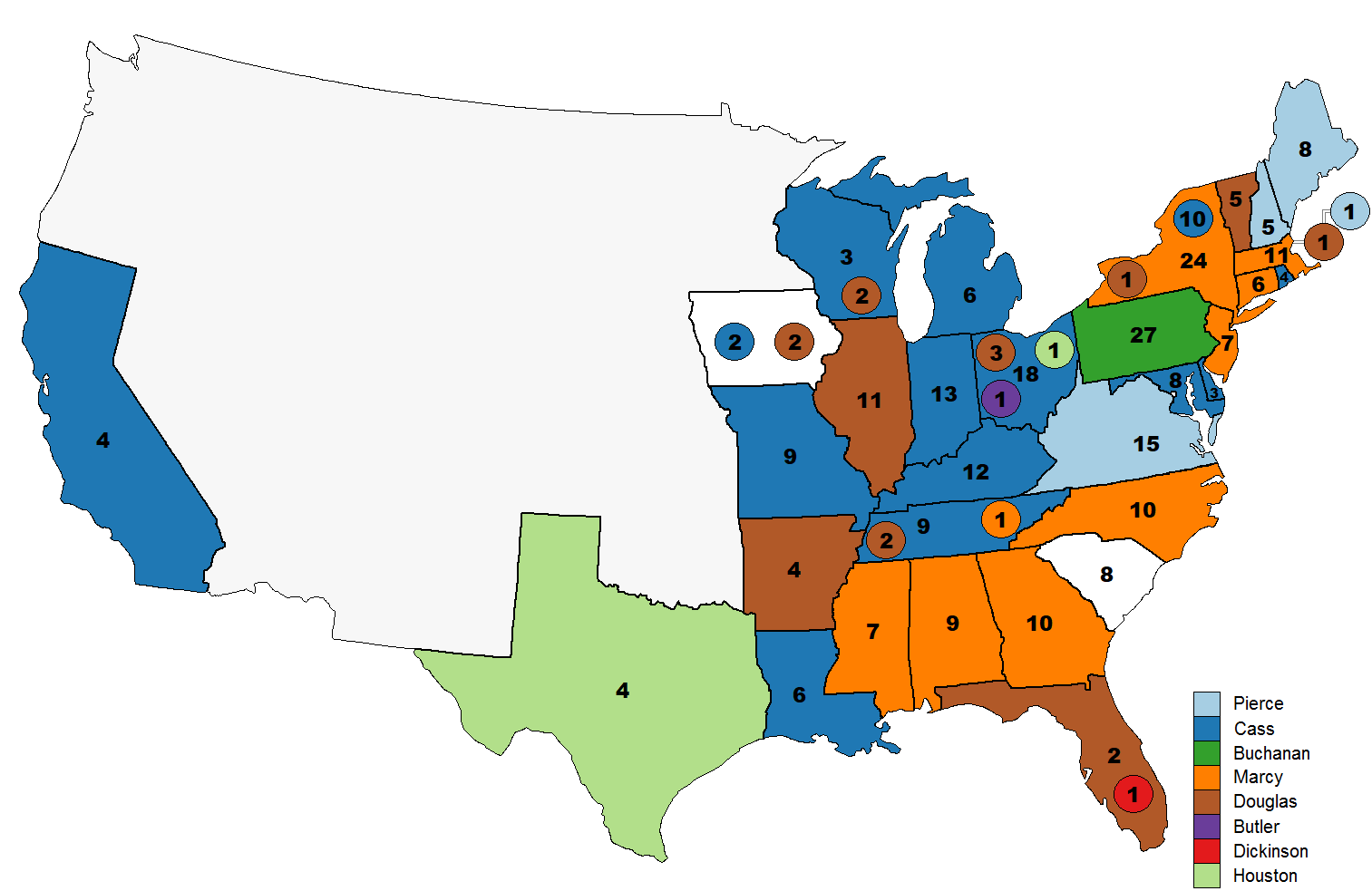
41st Ballot

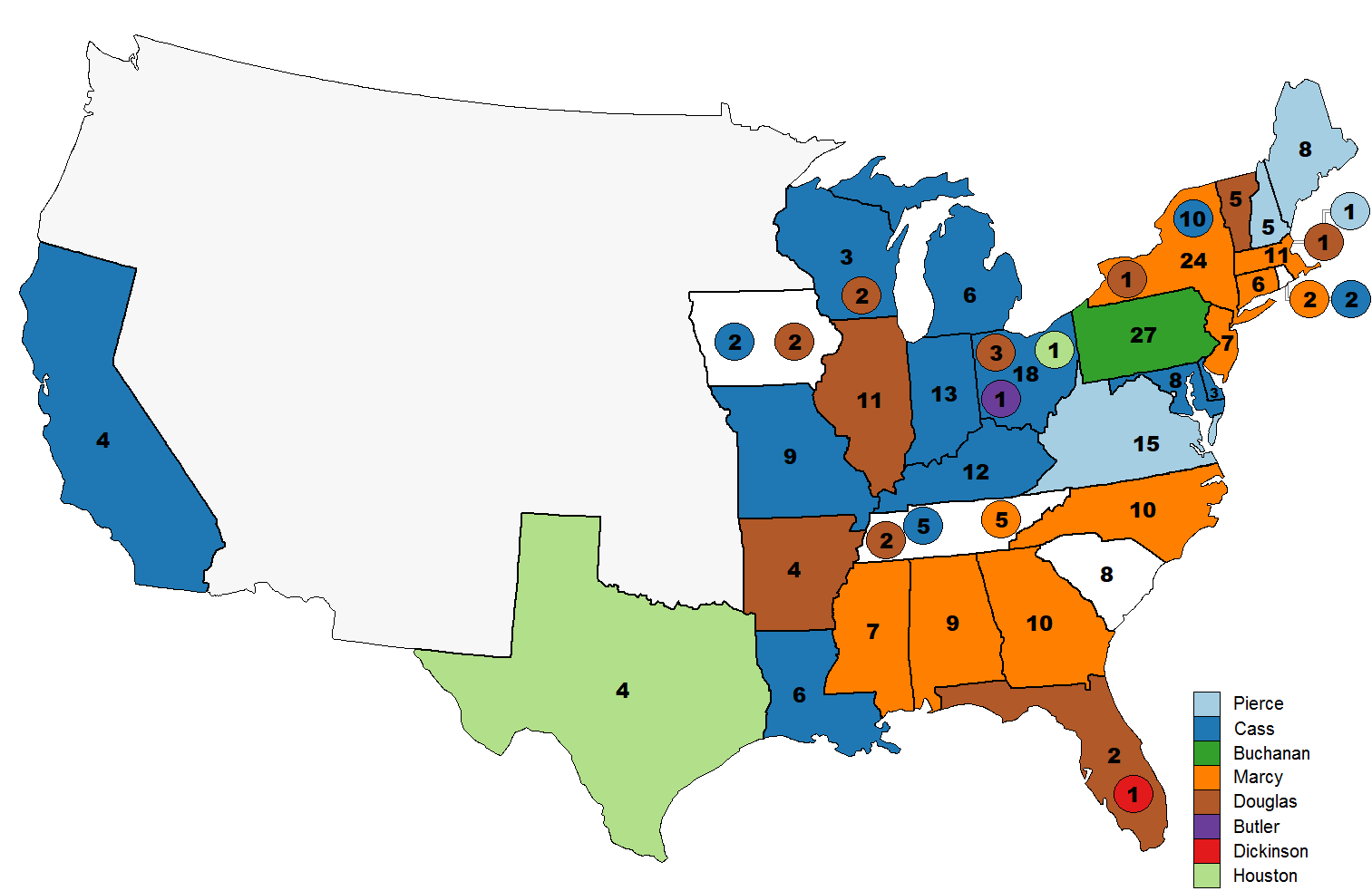
42nd Ballot

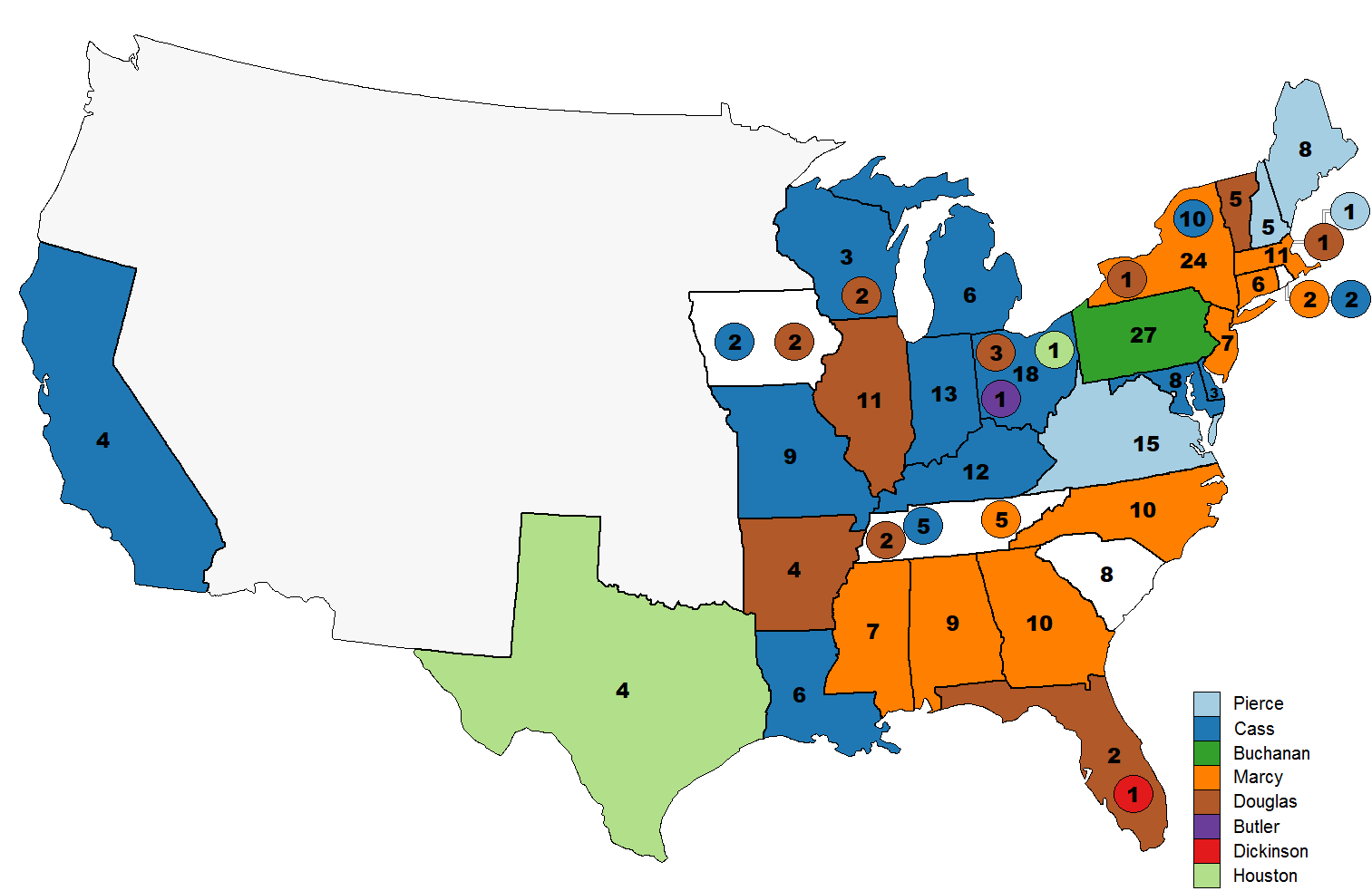
43rd Ballot

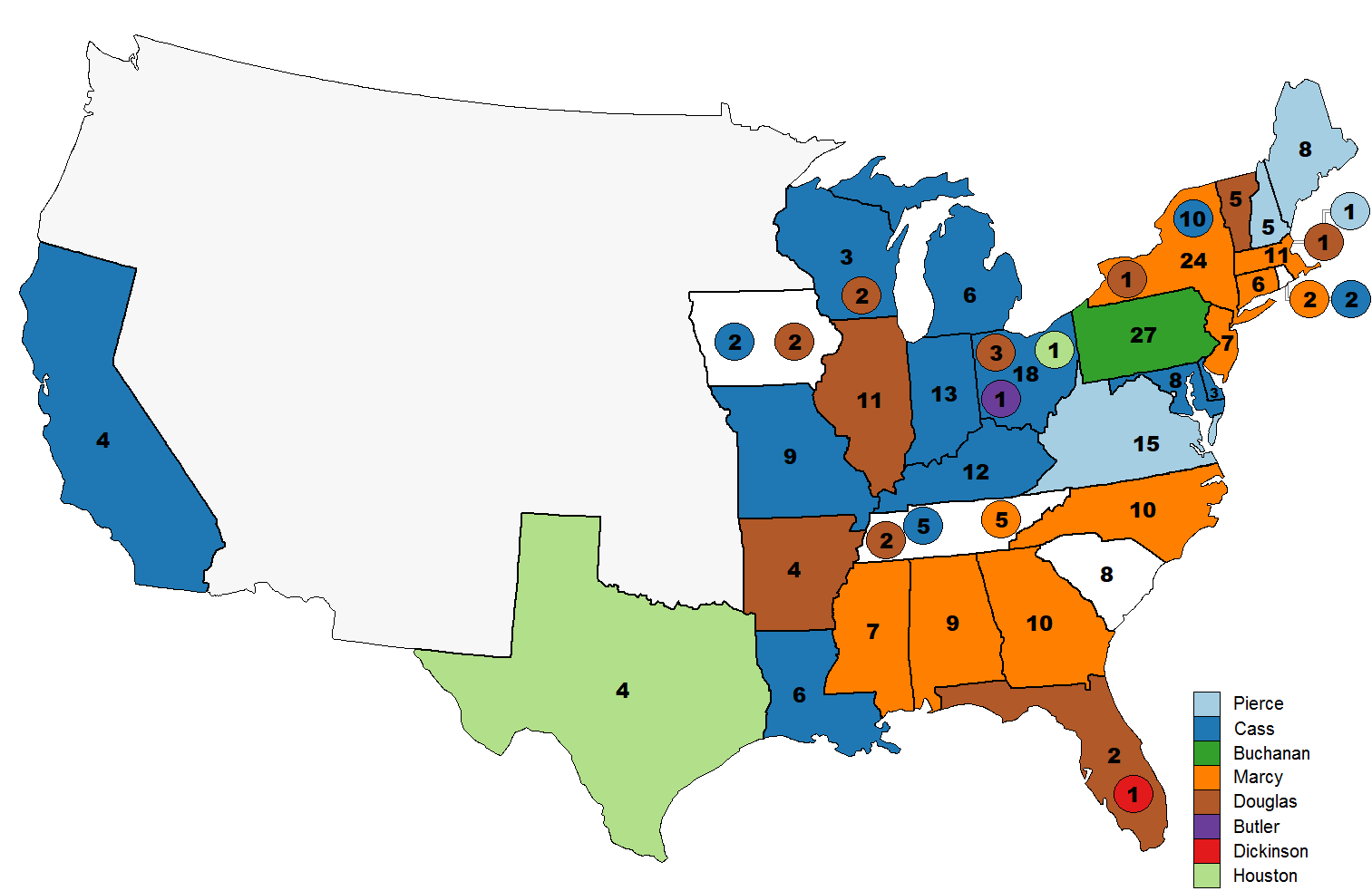
44th Ballot

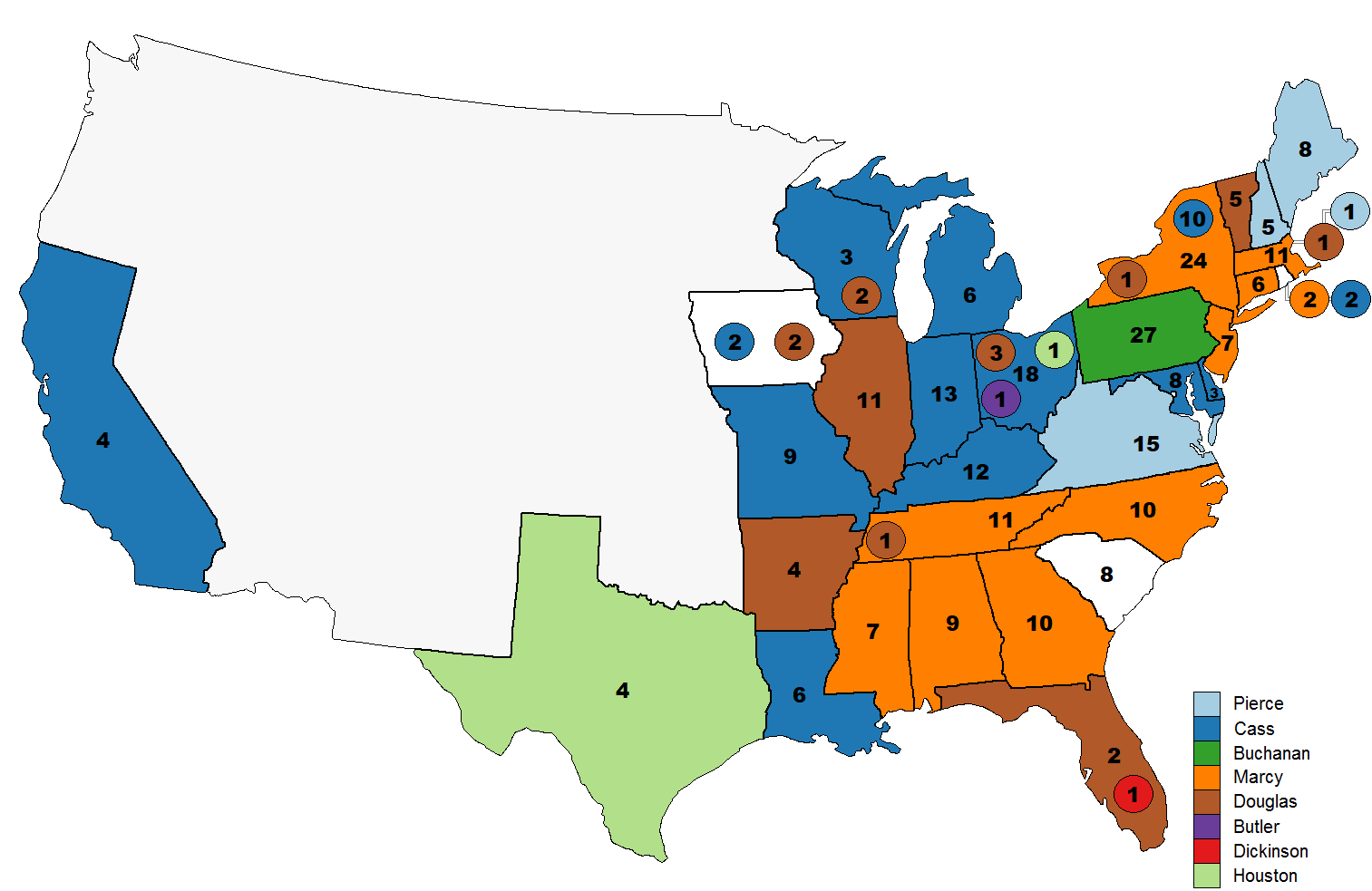
45th Ballot

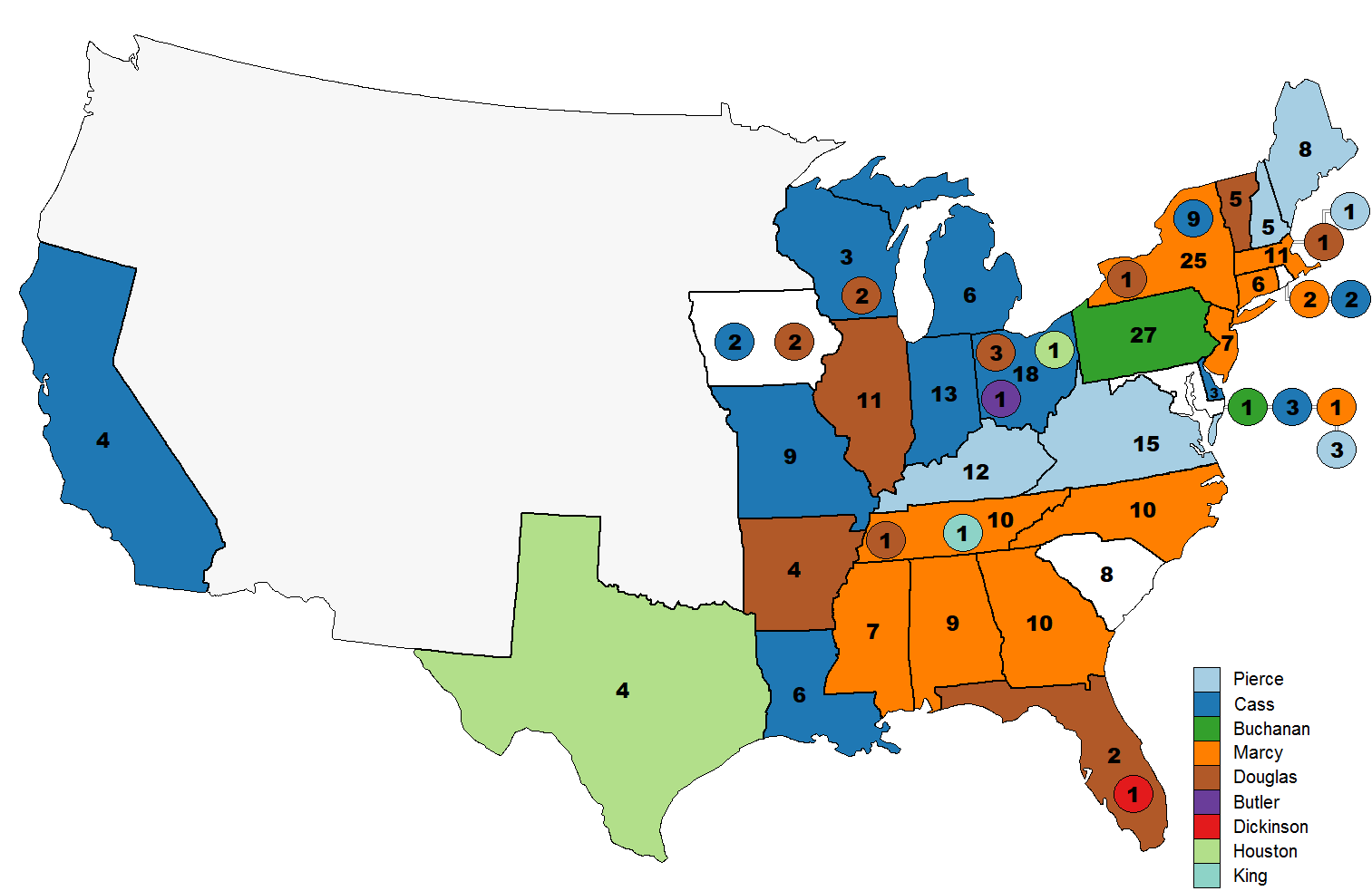
46th Ballot
(Marcy's Peak)

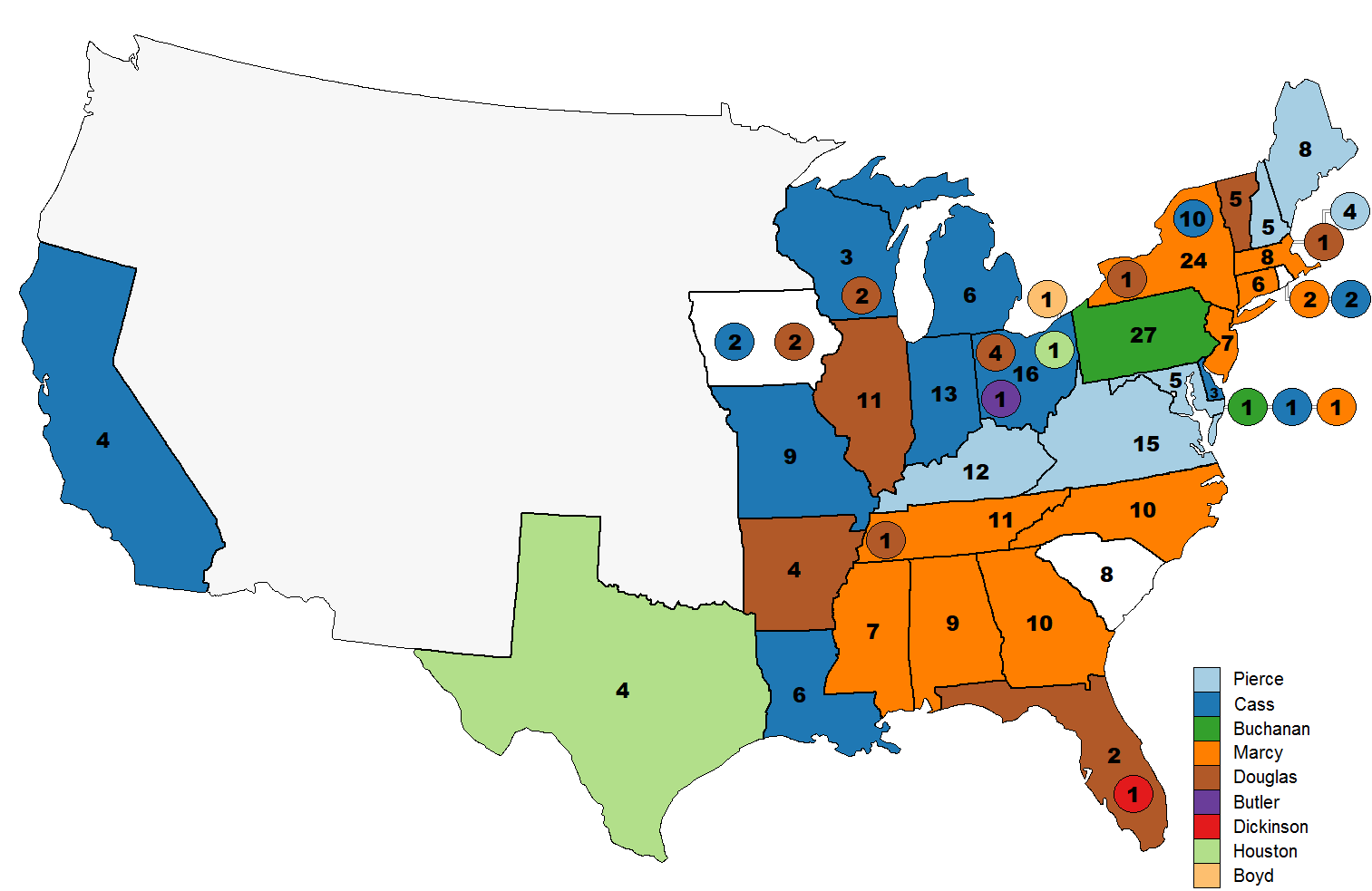
47th Ballot

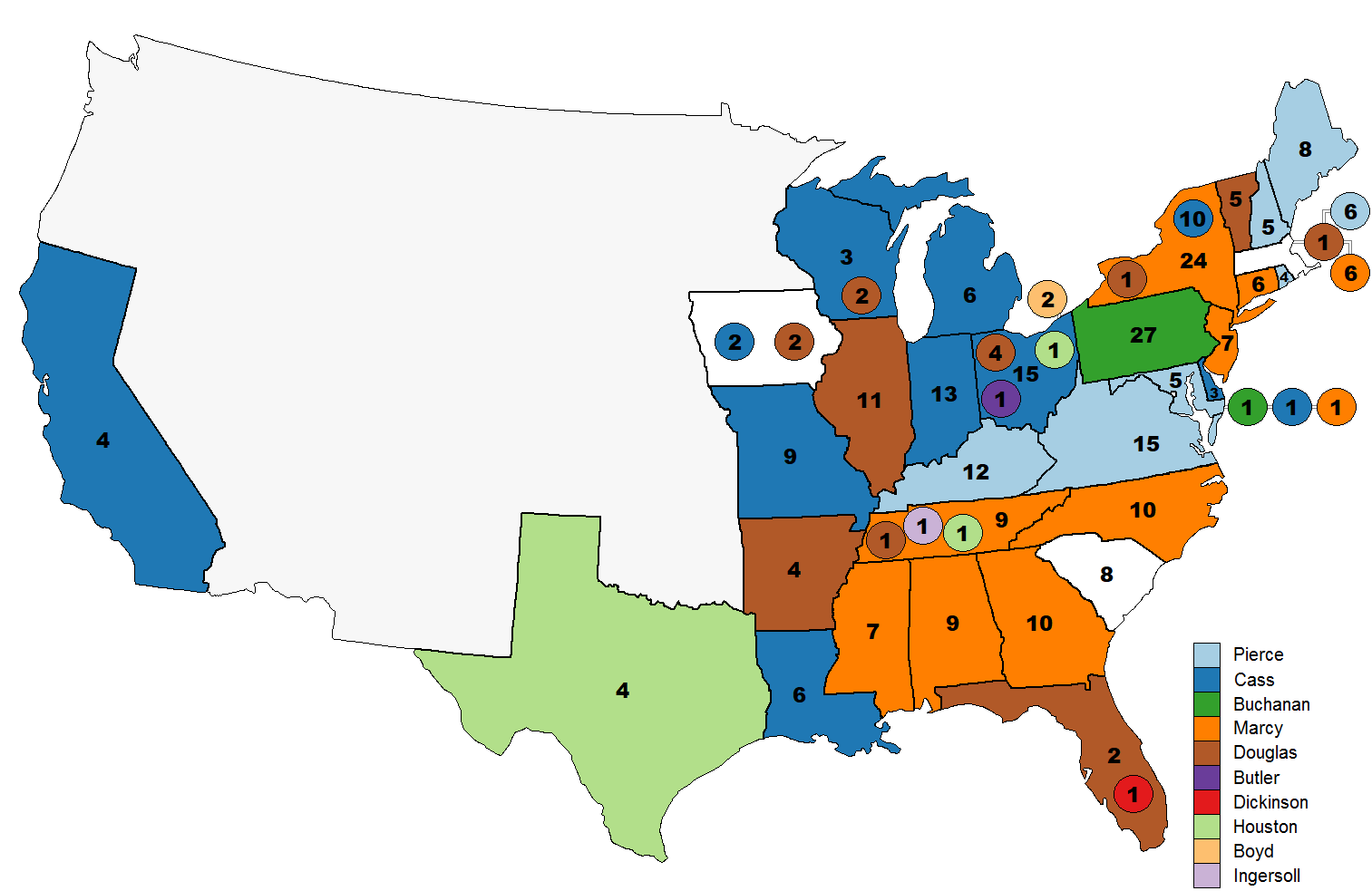
48th Ballot

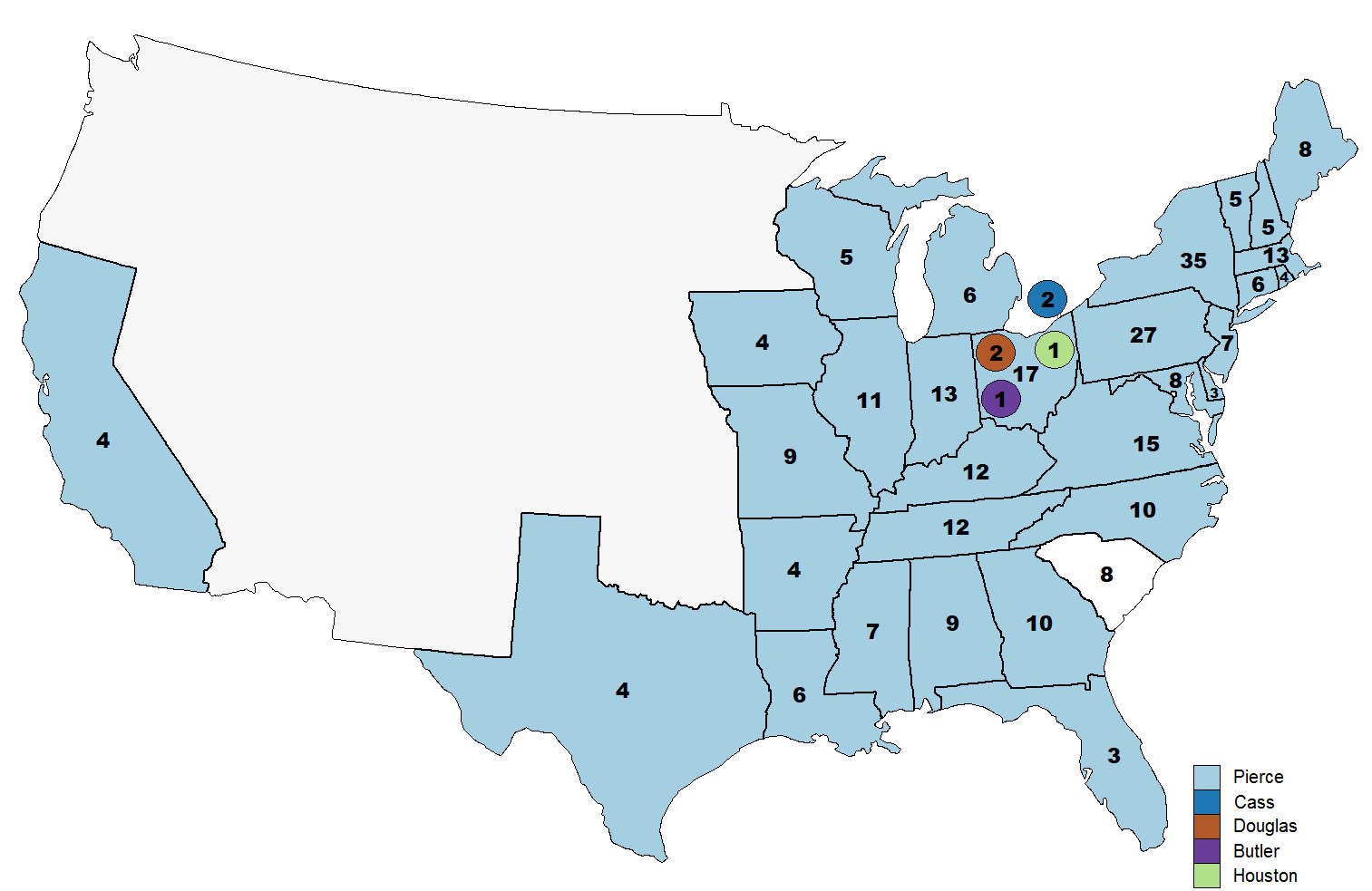
49th Ballot

== Vice presidential nomination ==
=== Vice presidential candidates ===
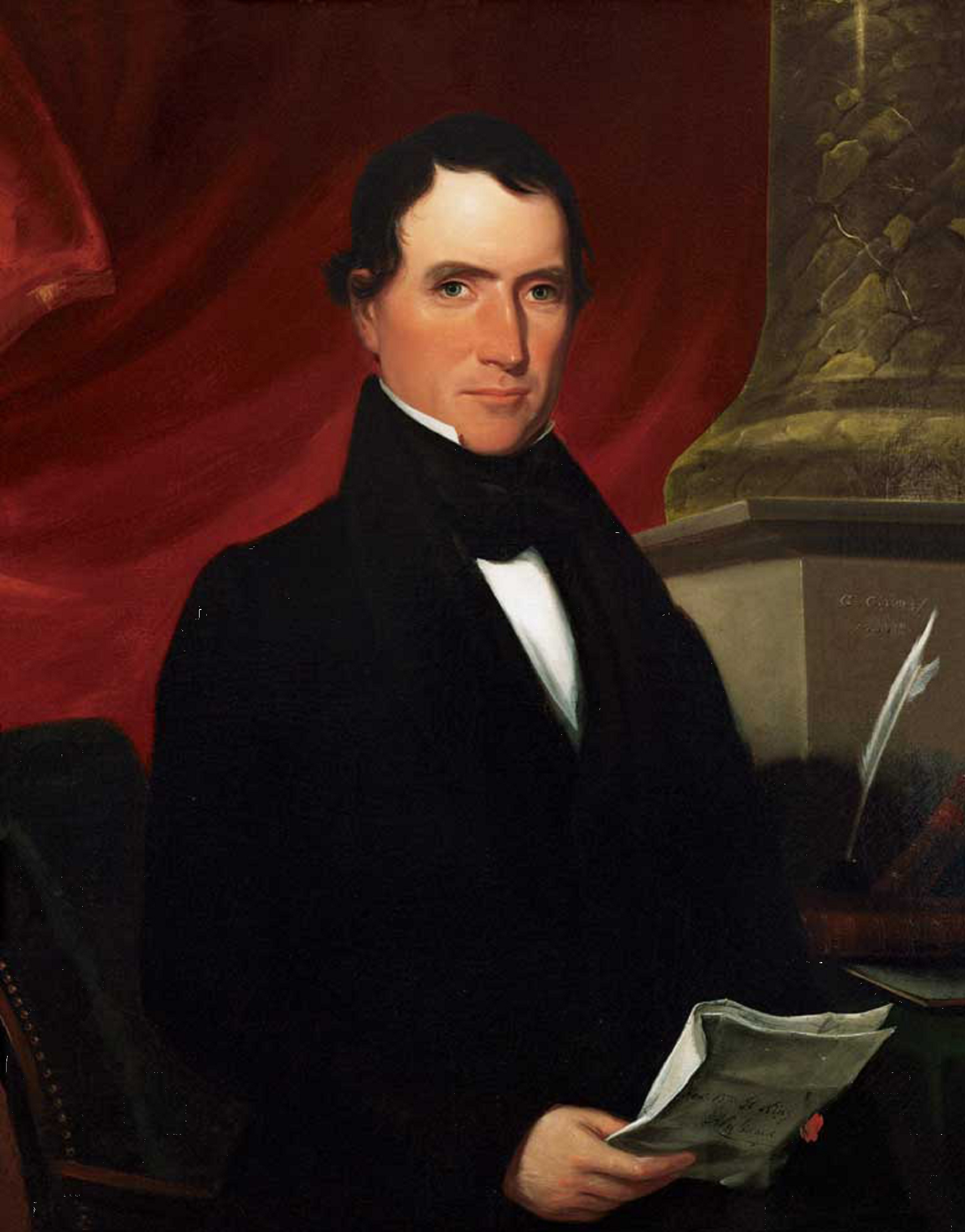
Senator
William R. King
of Alabama

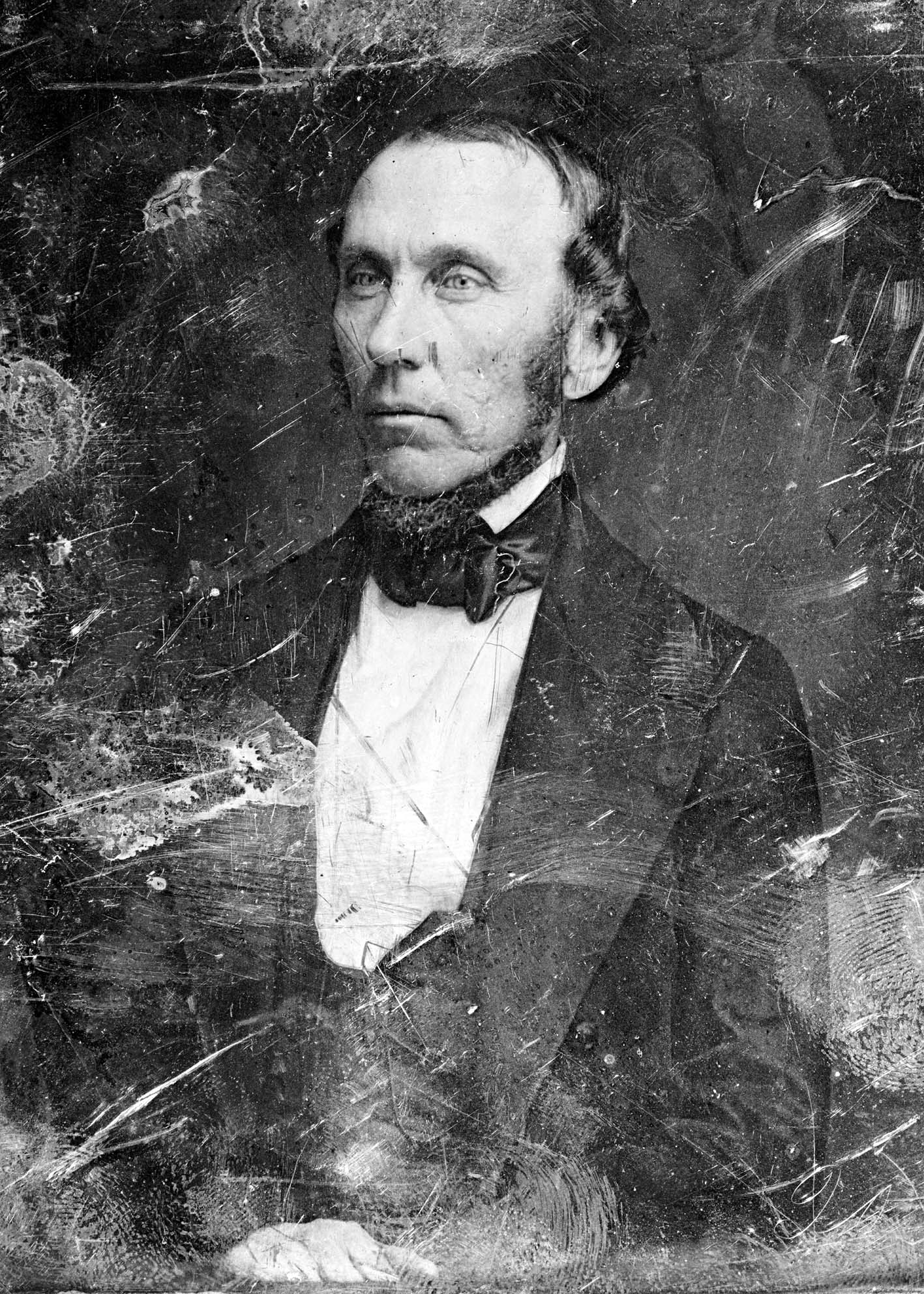
Senator
Solomon W. Downs
of Louisiana

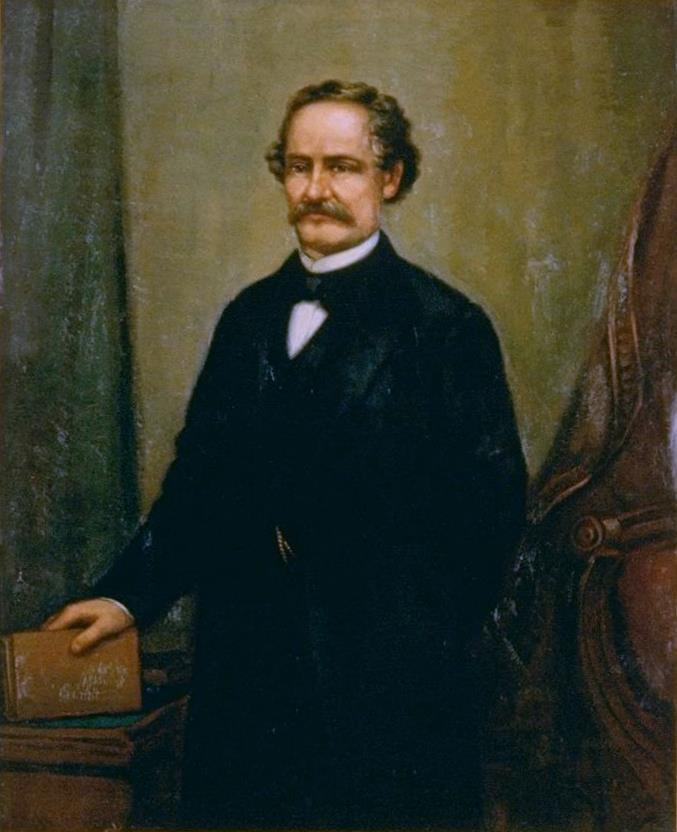
Senator
John B. Weller
of California

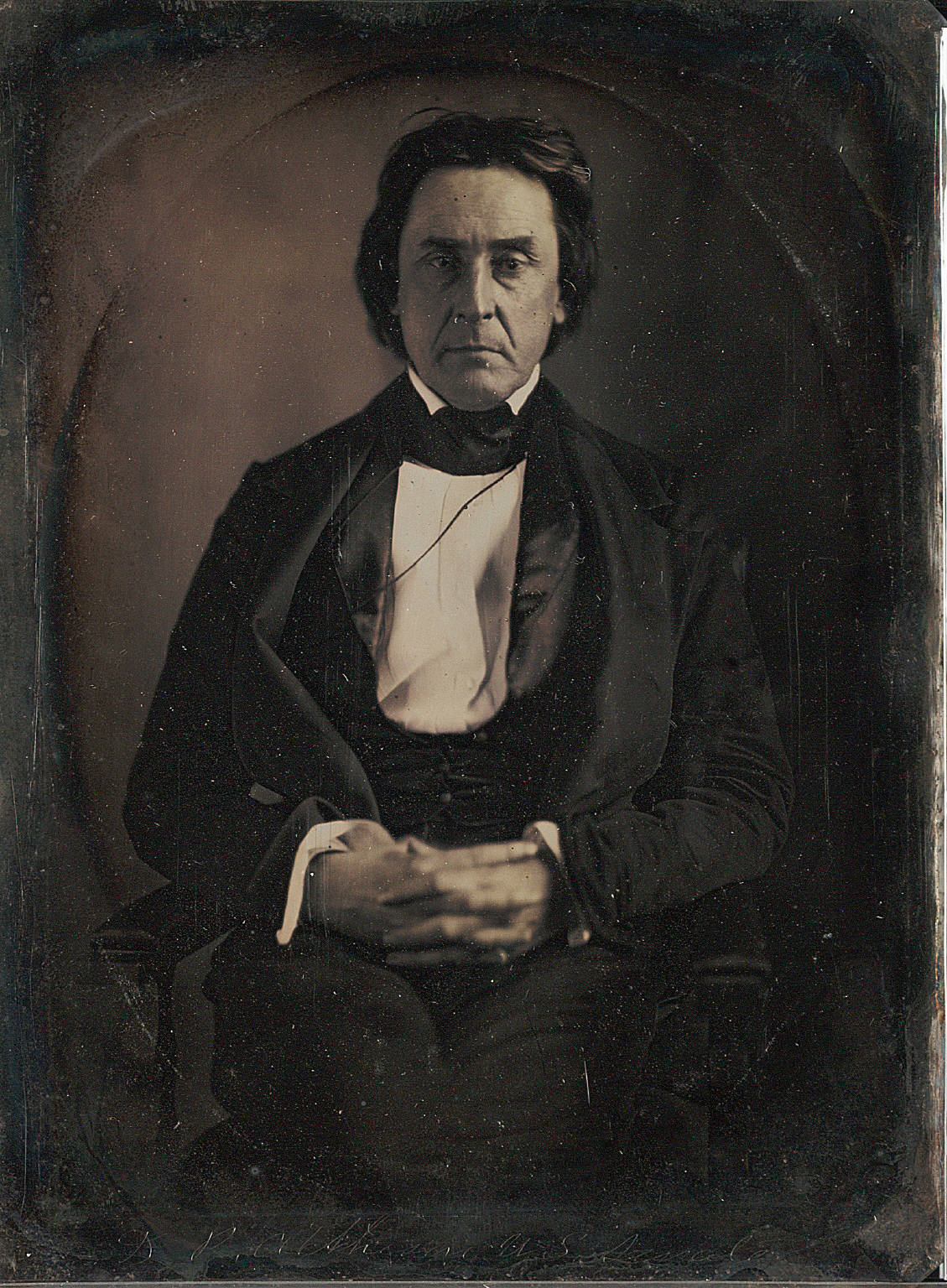
Senator
David Rice Atchison
of Missouri

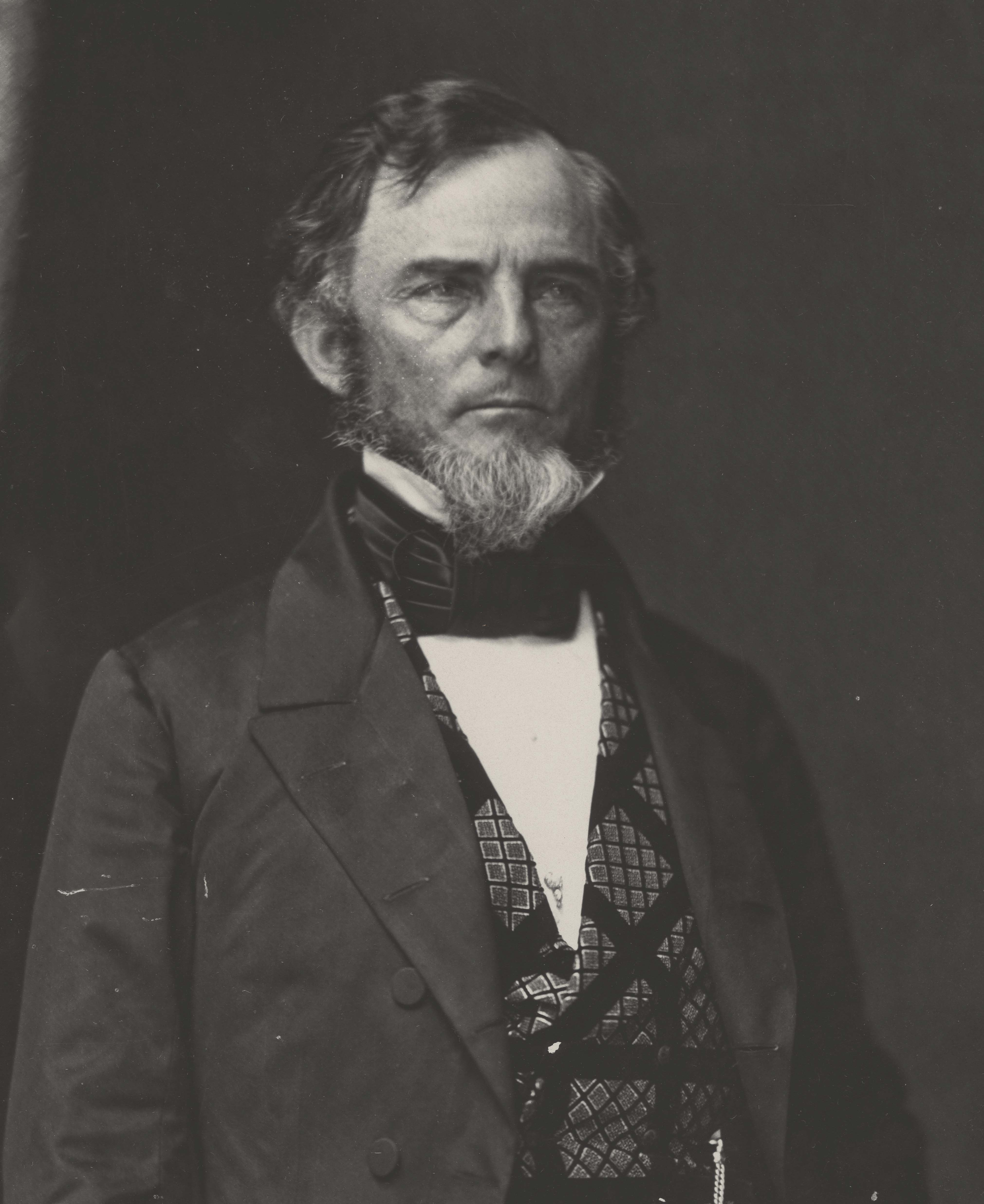
Major General
Gideon J. Pillow
of Tennessee

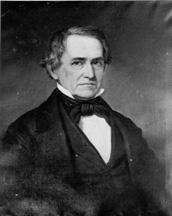
Former Senator
Robert Strange
of North Carolina

=== Declined ===
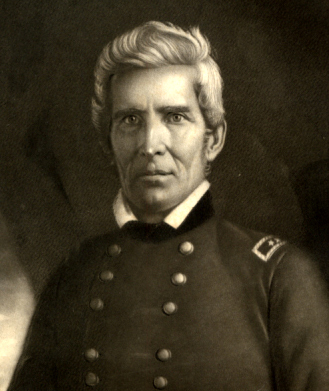
Former Representative
William O. Butler
of Kentucky

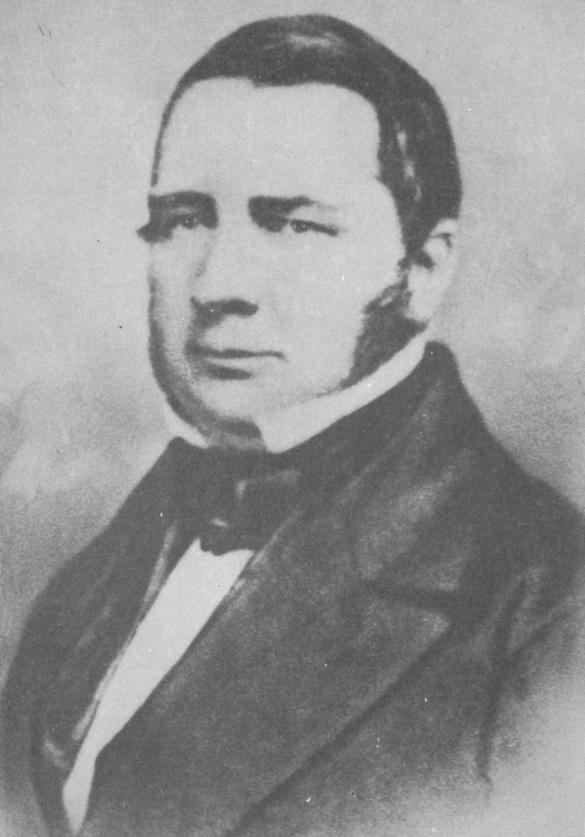
Senator
Thomas J. Rusk
of Texas

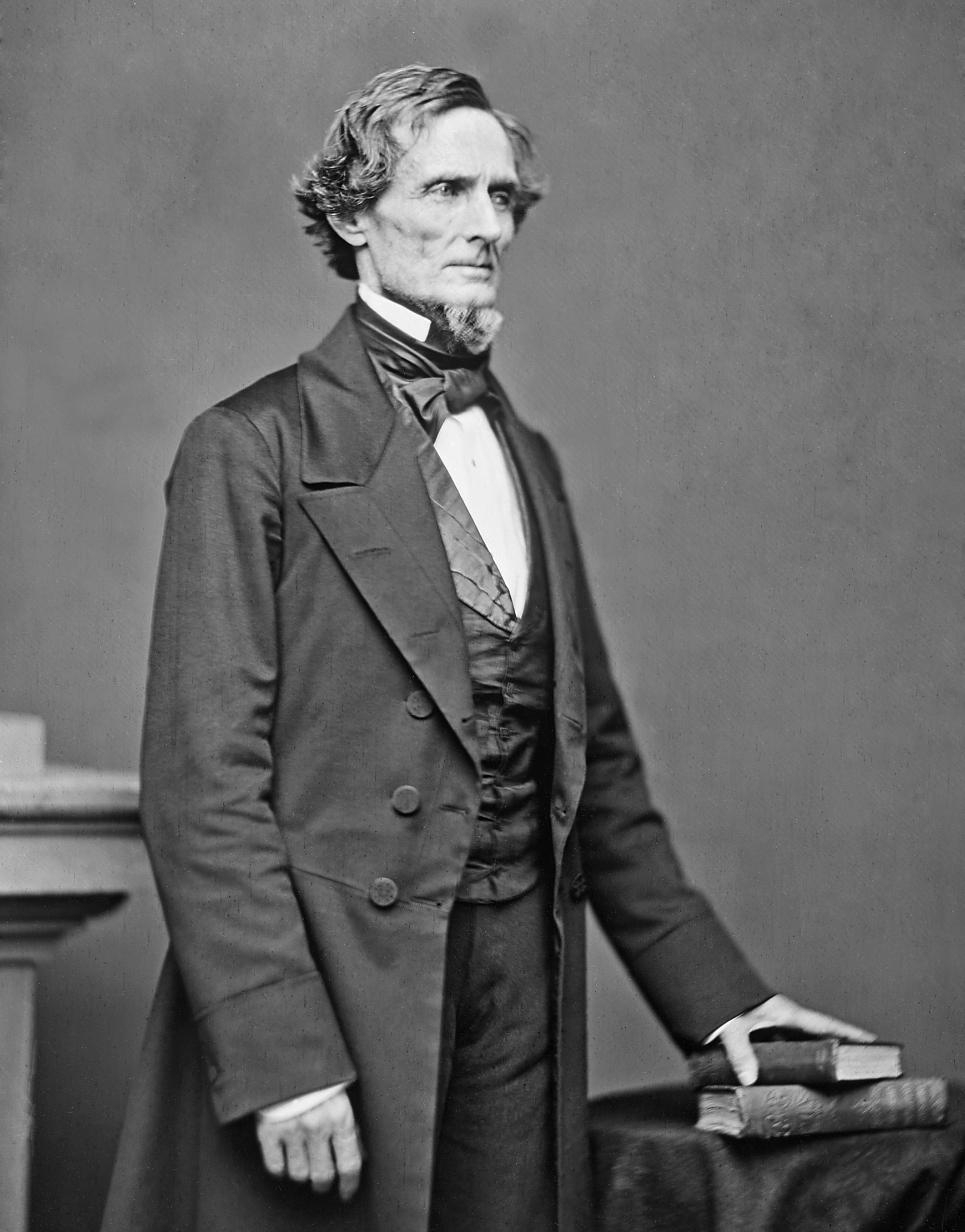
Former Senator
Jefferson Davis
of Mississippi

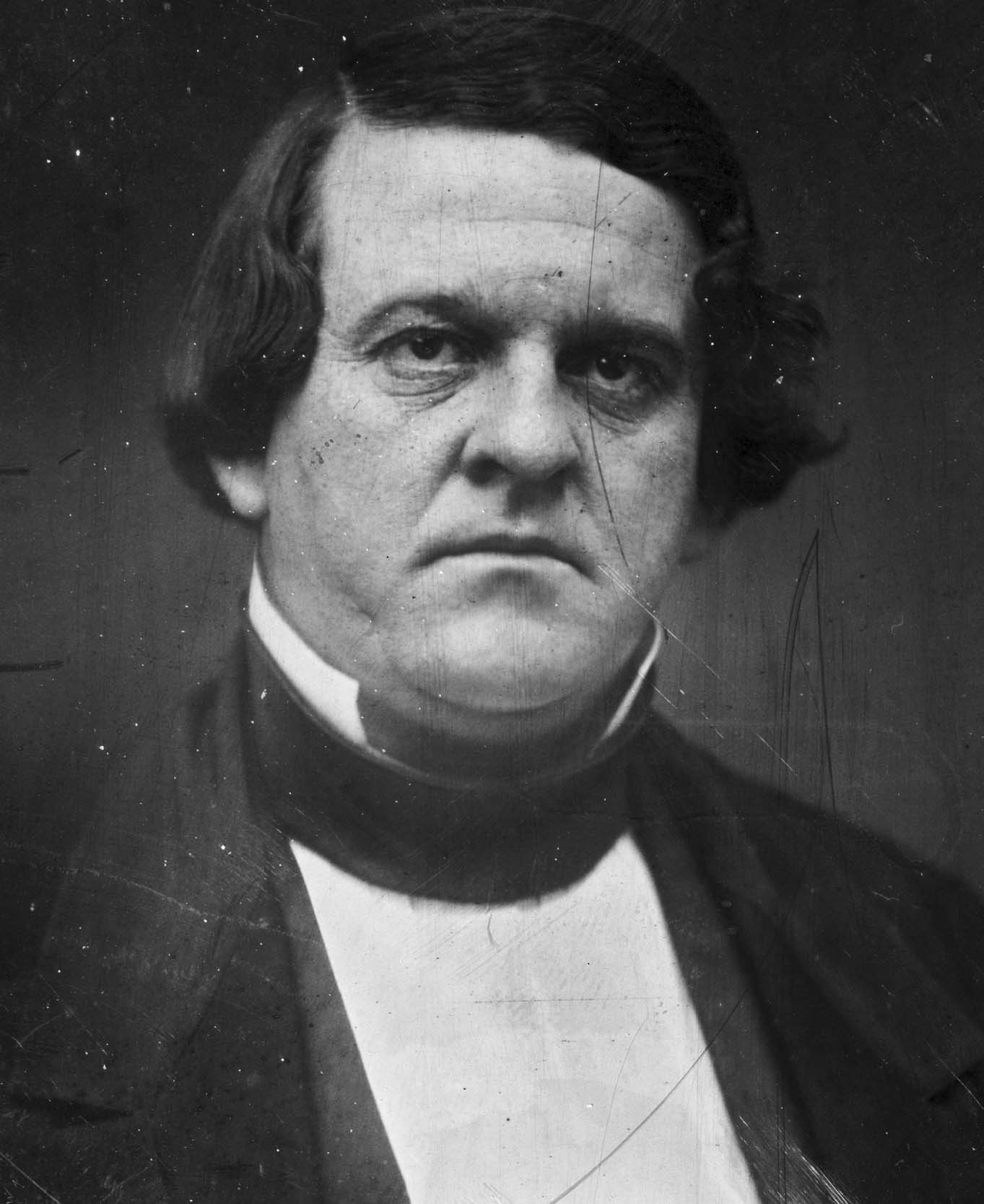
Governor
Howell Cobb
of Georgia

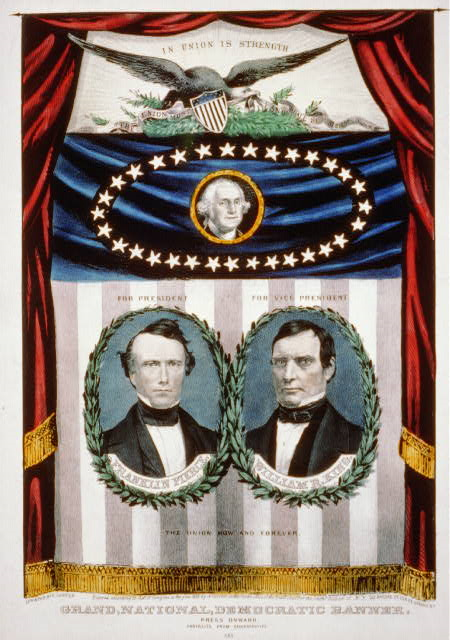
Democratic Pierce/King campaign poster

In a peace gesture to the Buchanan wing of the party, Pierce's supporters allowed Buchanan's allies to fill the second position, knowing that they would select Alabama Senator William R. King, to whom Pierce had no objections. King won the nomination on the second ballot. During the ensuing campaign, King's tuberculosis, which he believed he had contracted while living in Paris, denied him the active behind-the-scenes role that he might otherwise have played, although he worked hard to assure his region's voters with the statement that New Hampshire's Pierce was a "northern man with southern principles."

Vice Presidential Ballot
	1st	2nd
King	125	277
Downs	30	0
Weller	28	0
Atchison	25	0
Pillow	25	0
Strange	23	0
Butler	13	0
Rusk	13	0
Davis	2	11
Cobb	2	0
Not Voting	2	0
Not Represented	8	8

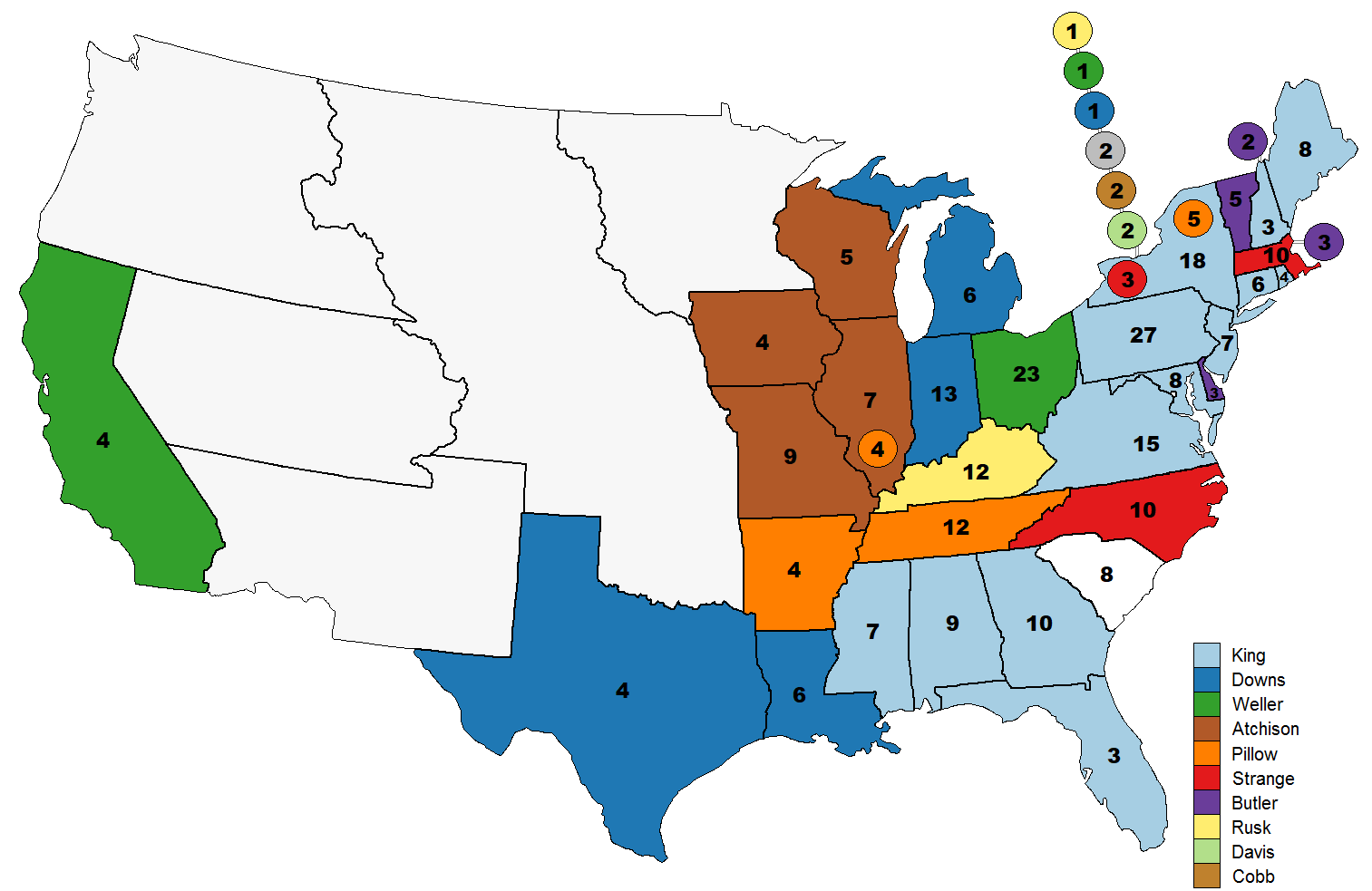
1st Vice Presidential Ballot

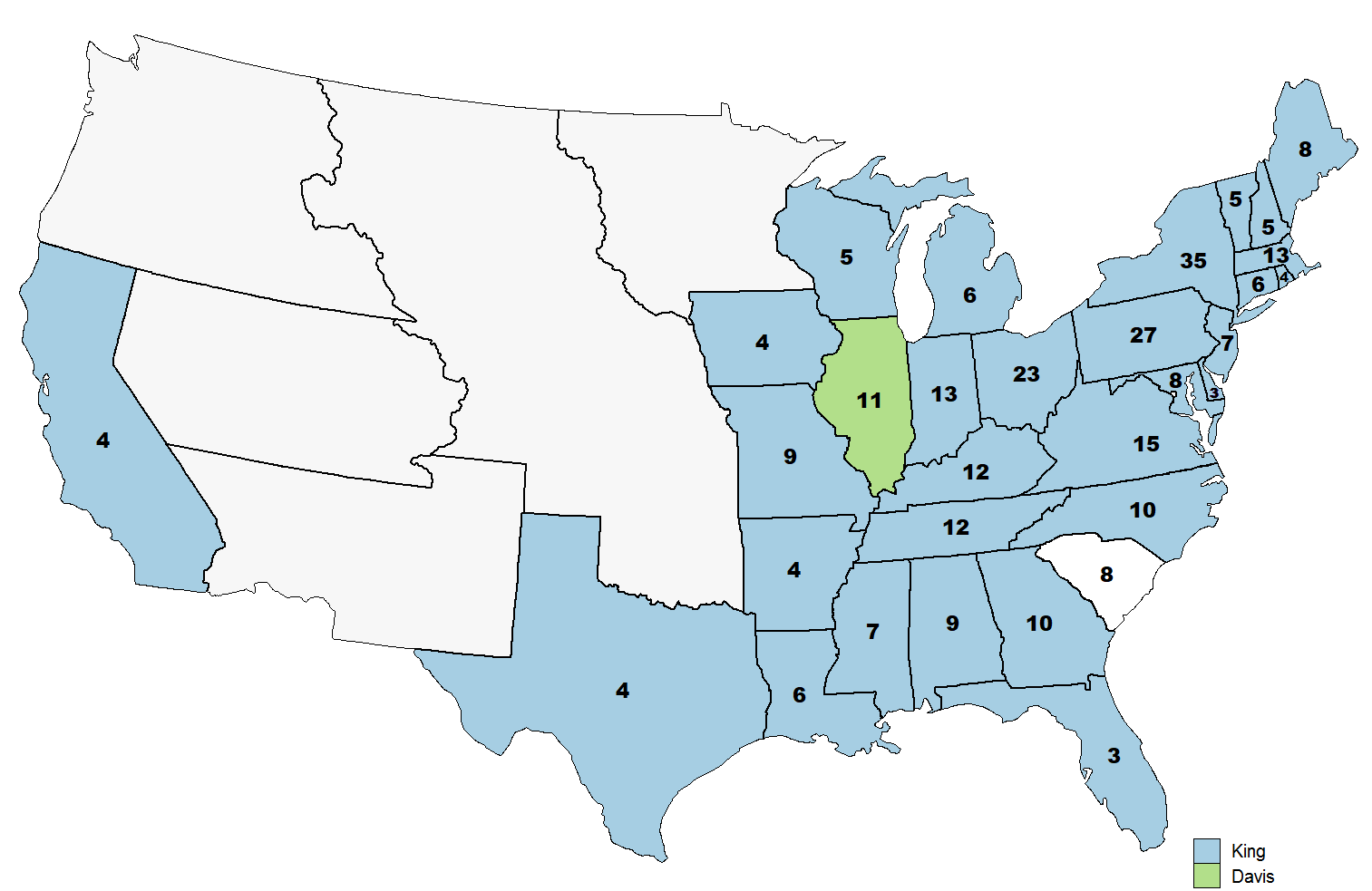
2nd Vice Presidential Ballot

== See also ==
- History of the Democratic Party (United States)
- 1852 Whig National Convention
- List of Democratic National Conventions
- U.S. presidential nomination convention
- 1852 United States presidential election

Preceded by 1848; Baltimore, Maryland	Democratic National Conventions	Succeeded by 1856; Cincinnati, Ohio
