= Franklin Pierce House =

Franklin Pierce House may refer to a home of Franklin Pierce, 14th president of the United States:

- Pierce Manse, at 14 Horseshoe Pond Lane, Concord, New Hampshire, Pierce's home from 1842 to 1848
- Franklin Pierce House (South Main Street, Concord, New Hampshire), at 52 South Main Street, Concord, New Hampshire, Pierce's home from 1856 to 1869, listed on the National Register of Historic Places
