= Franklin Pierce Homestead =

Historic house in New Hampshire, United States

- U.S. National Register of Historic Places
- U.S. National Historic Landmark
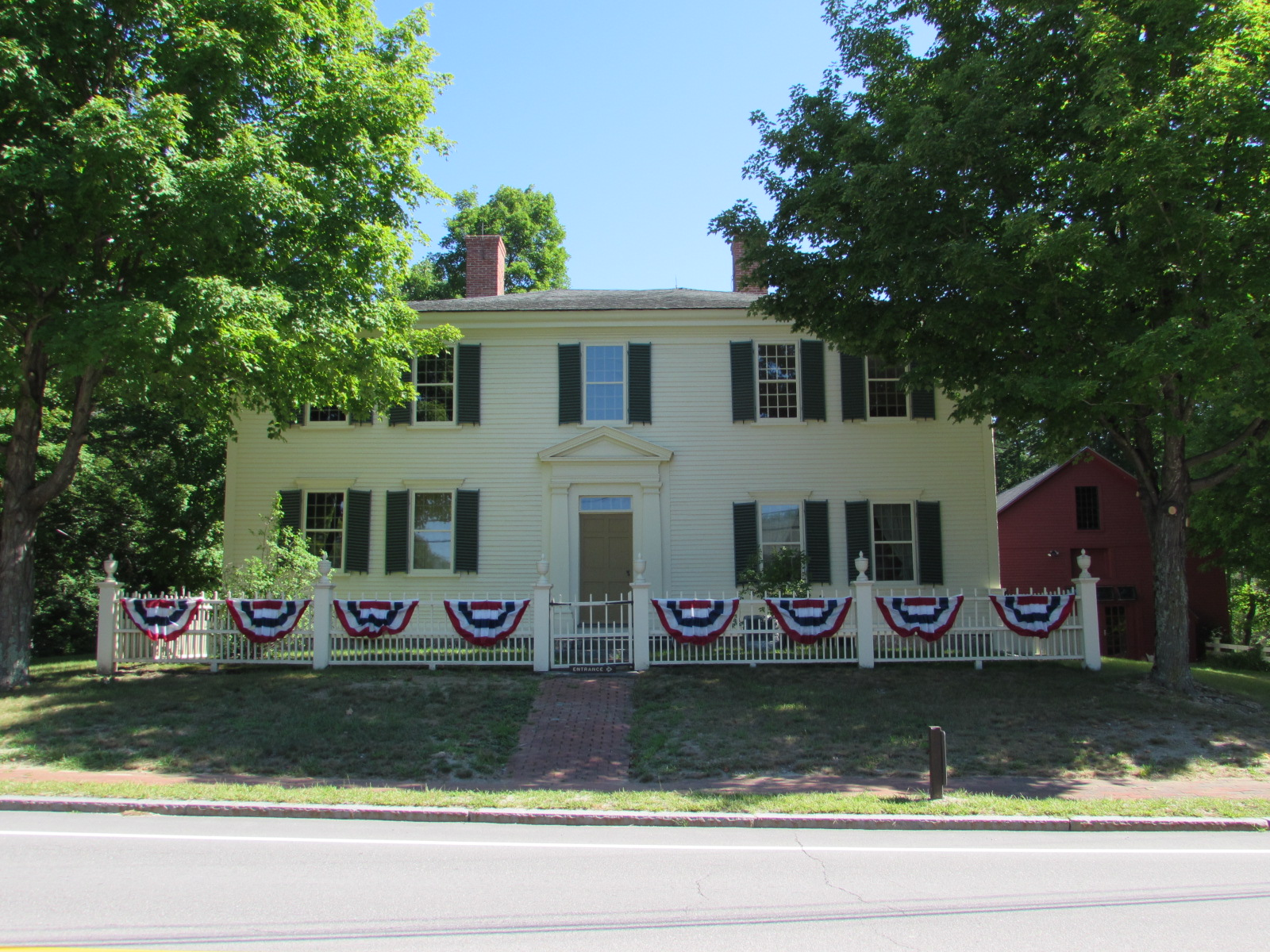
- Nearest city: Hillsborough, New Hampshire
- Coordinates: 43°6′59″N 71°57′2″W
- Area: 13 acres (5.3 ha)
- Built: 1804
- Website: Franklin Pierce Homestead State Historic Site
- NRHP reference No.: 66000027

Significant dates
- Added to NRHP: October 15, 1966
- Designated NHL: July 4, 1961

The Franklin Pierce Homestead is a historic house museum and state park located in Hillsborough, New Hampshire. It was the childhood home of the 14th president of the United States, Franklin Pierce.

== Overview ==
The house is located on the east side of Washington Road (New Hampshire Route 31), about 100 yards north of its intersection with New Hampshire Route 9, on a 13-acre (5.3 ha) property in the Lower Village area of Hillsborough. It is a two-story hip-roofed wood frame structure whose main block was built in 1804. There are two entries, one on the west (street-facing) facade and one on the south facade. Both are topped by five-light transom windows, and flanked by pilasters which support an entablature and triangular pediment. A two-story wing was added to the rear of the house, probably later in the 19th century. Attached to this wing are a small wellhouse, and a single-story shed connecting the house to a gable-roofed barn.

The interior of the main block has four rooms in the first floor, organized around a central hall and stairs. The parlor is to the left, and the dining room to the right. The kitchen is behind the dining room, and the master bedroom is behind the parlor. On the second floor, the front of the house is taken up by a full-width ballroom, while the back has two bedrooms, each with a dressing room. All of the rooms of the main block were originally decorated with stenciling, some of which has survived. The wing contains a kitchen and laundry below, and bedrooms (presumably for servants) above. Later owners moved a barn to adjoin the house, removed the front yard fence, and added a porch, which was removed by 1929.

== History ==
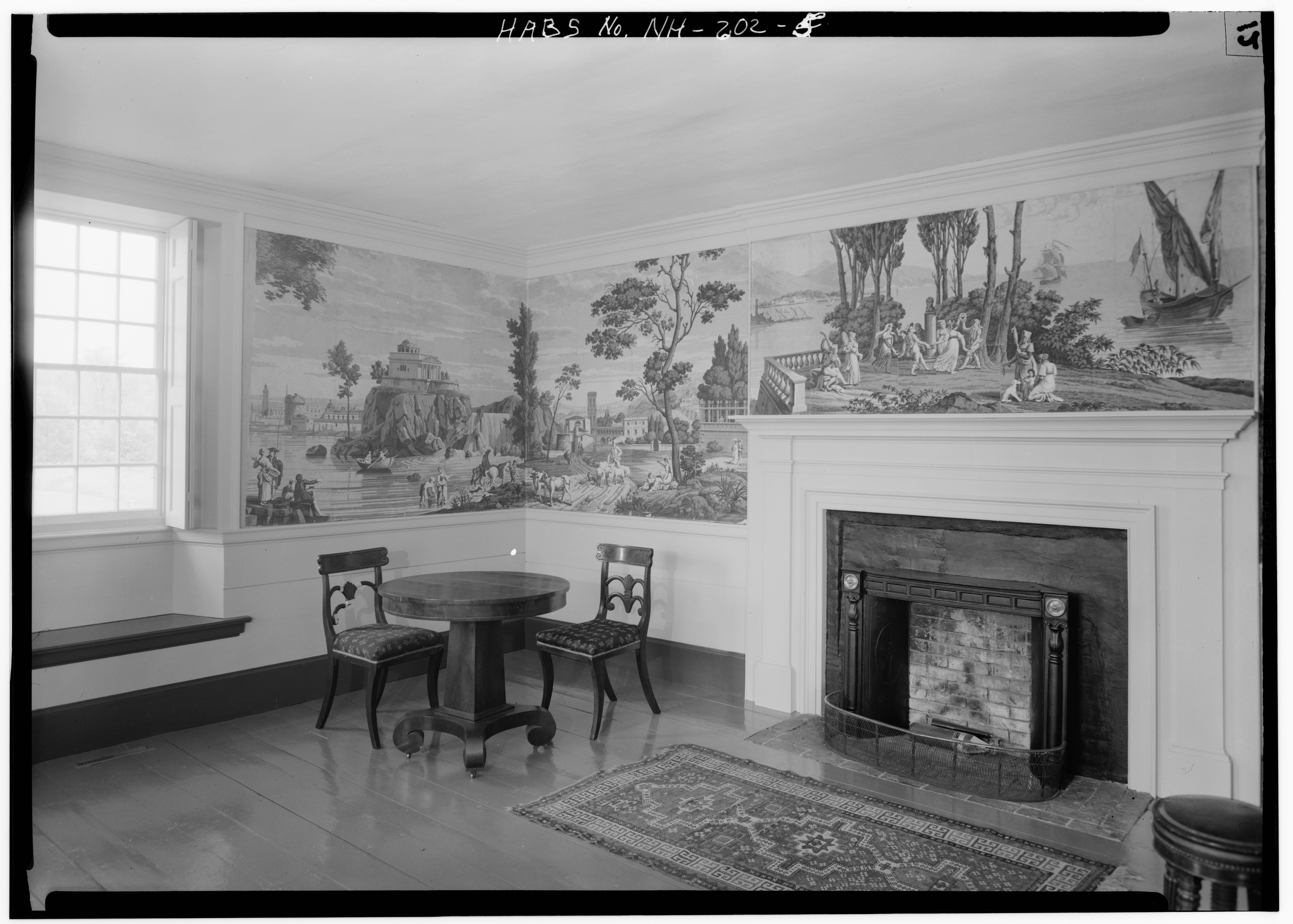
Early 20th century image of the home's interior

The home was built in 1804 by the future president's father, Benjamin Pierce, who had served during the American Revolution and would later become governor of New Hampshire. Benjamin Pierce bought 200 acres (81 ha) in the Lower Village area of Hillsborough after the new state turnpike opened nearby. In addition to the home, he also built a tavern here. After Benjamin Pierce's death in 1839, the property was transferred to his son-in-law John McNeil Jr., a general during the War of 1812. McNeil had married Pierce's daughter Elizabeth, whose house next door was built in 1807 and is today known as the Elizabeth Pierce House, an antique shop.

The home is one of Franklin Pierce's probable places of birth, the other now lying beneath the nearby impoundment of Franklin Pierce Lake. Pierce lived at the homestead until 1834 when he married, with the exception of a seven-year span spent away for school, college, and law study. He graduated from Bowdoin College in 1824, as the young Pierce and his friends were supporting Andrew Jackson for President, and returned to the family home in Hillsborough to study law. He moved to Portsmouth, New Hampshire, in the Spring of 1825 to work in the law office of Levi Woodbury. In March 1828, Pierce returned to Hillsborough and made his first formal political appearance to assist his father's campaign for governor at a town meeting. He returned to the family homestead in 1834 when he married Jane Appleton. Jane was never comfortable in Hillsborough, and the Pierces moved to Concord, New Hampshire, while Franklin was then serving in the state legislature, where they lived in a rented house while he established a new law partnership.

On August 19, 1852, the town hosted a mass meeting and rally for Pierce's presidential campaign which drew an estimated 25,000 people with speeches and food. At the end of his single term, Pierce returned temporarily to the family homestead in June 1857.

== Preservation and current use ==
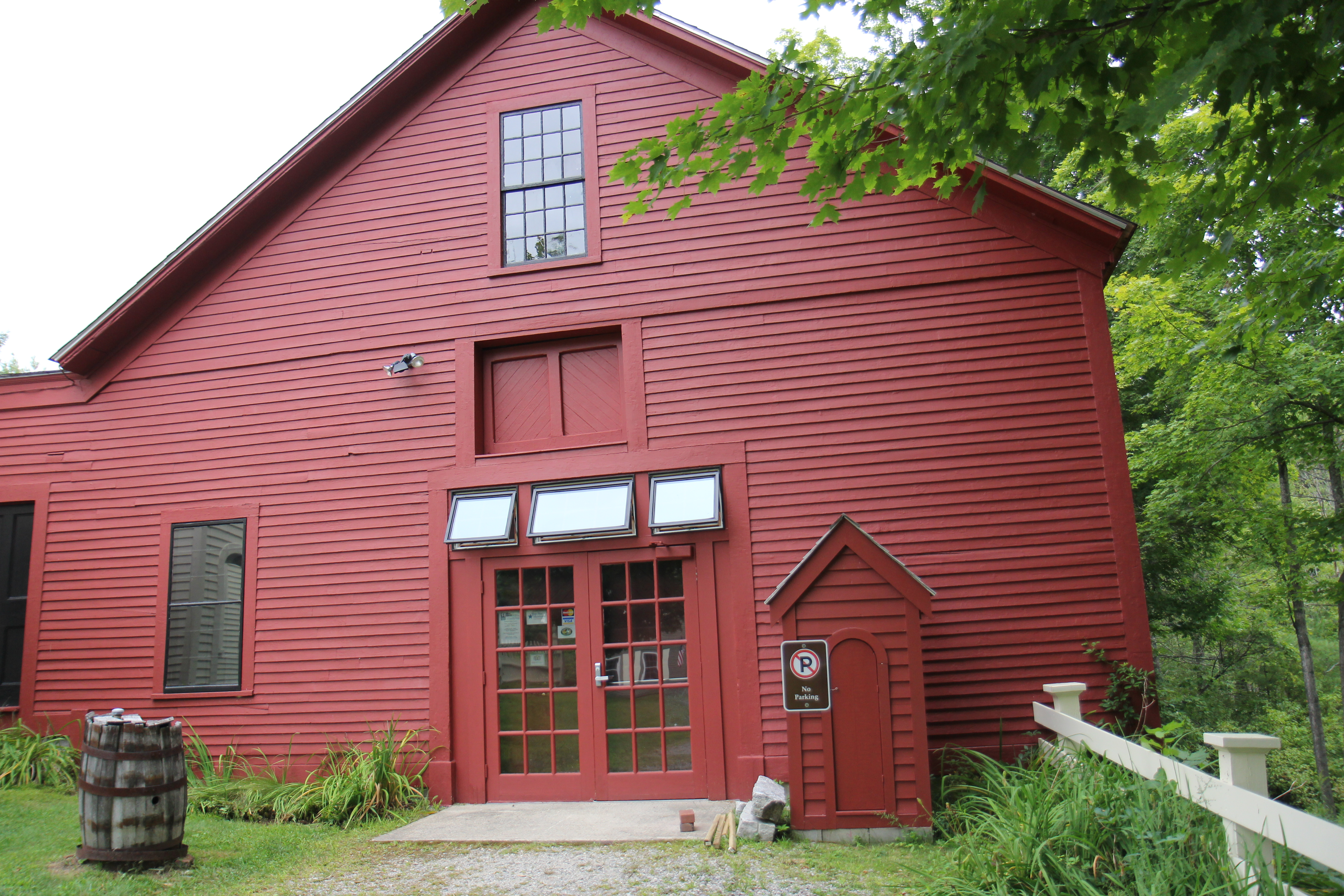
The barn used as a Welcome Center

The home remained in the Pierce family until 1925, when it was donated to the state of New Hampshire. It underwent restoration and renovation in the 1940s and the 1960s. The home has been designated a state park and was declared a National Historic Landmark in 1961. The barn has been converted to a welcome center with displays and artifacts. The home is operated by the New Hampshire Bureau of Historic Sites.

== See also ==
- Franklin Pierce House (South Main Street, Concord, New Hampshire), where Pierce died (since demolished)
- Pierce Manse, Pierce's Concord home 1842–1848
- List of residences of presidents of the United States
- List of National Historic Landmarks in New Hampshire
- National Register of Historic Places listings in Hillsborough County, New Hampshire
- New Hampshire Historical Marker No. 65: Pierce Homestead
- Presidential memorials in the United States

== Sources ==
- Hillsborough Historical Society (2012). Hillsborough. Arcadia Publishing. ISBN 978-0-7385-7672-5.
- Holt, Michael F. (March 30, 2010). Franklin Pierce. Times Books. ISBN 978-0-8050-8719-2.
