= Pierce Manse =

Historic house in New Hampshire, United States

Coordinates: 43°13′03″N 71°32′34″W

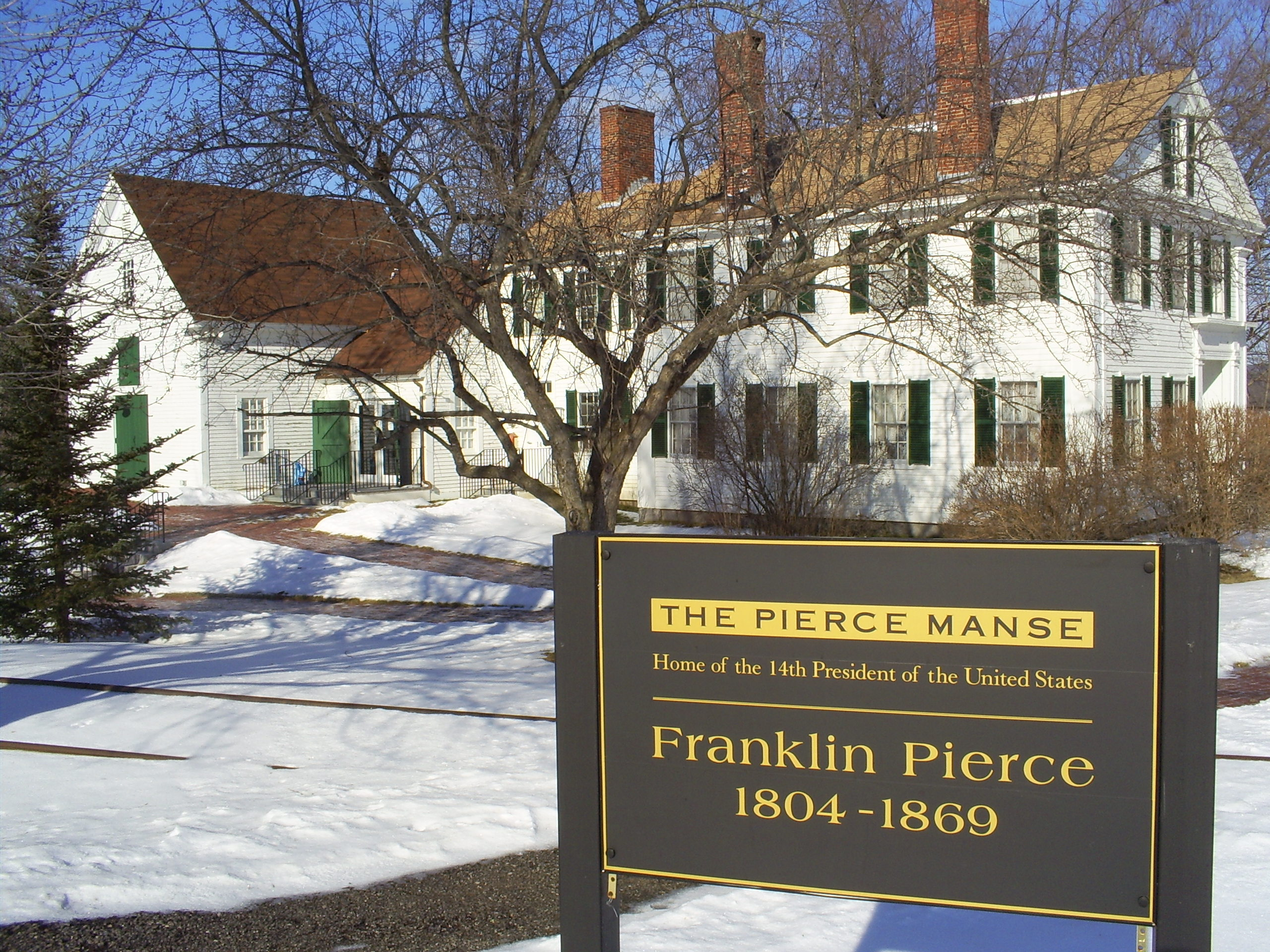
Pierce Manse in winter

The Pierce Manse is a historic house museum located in Concord, New Hampshire. It was the home of the 14th president of the United States, Franklin Pierce, who lived there from 1842 to 1848, not long before his presidency.

== Overview ==
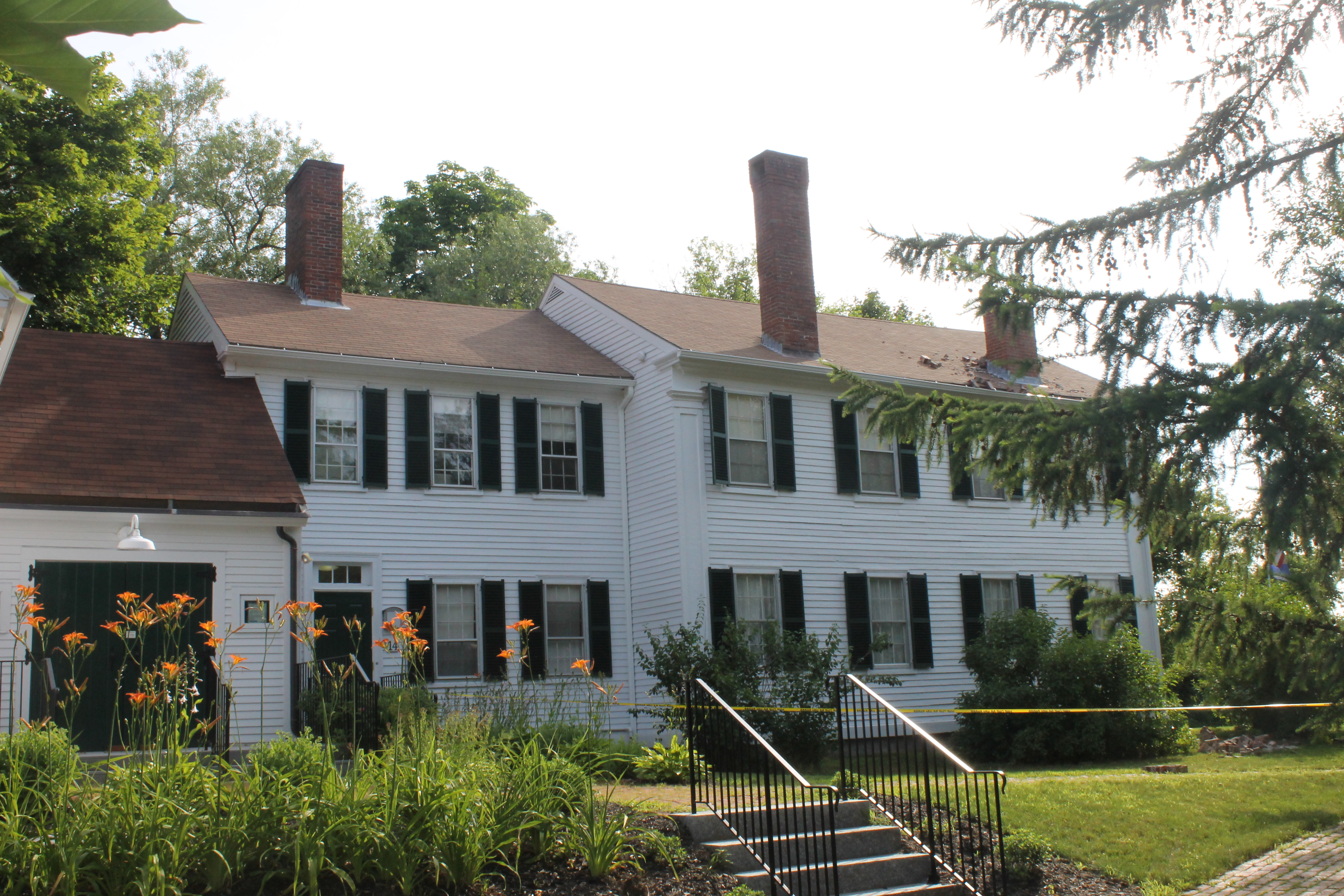
Pierce Manse (summer 2014)

Franklin Pierce and his wife Jane Pierce moved here after she persuaded him to resign his seat in the United States Senate and leave Washington, D.C. They owned the home from 1842 to 1848. Pierce resumed his law practice and also served as district attorney and chairman of the Democratic Party. During this time, Pierce advocated on behalf of James K. Polk's campaign for the presidency. Polk appointed Pierce U.S. Attorney for the State of New Hampshire as a reward in 1845.

In May 1845, Pierce took a trip away from home to visit his friend Nathaniel Hawthorne and his wife Sophia Peabody, who were then living in The Old Manse in Concord, Massachusetts, along with their Bowdoin College friend Horatio Bridge. Peabody recalled the meeting fondly and recorded her first impression of Pierce as "loveliness and truth of character and natural refinement." In 1846, Polk offered Pierce the United States Attorney General position, which Pierce declined on account of his wife's health. That year, with the outbreak of the Mexican–American War, Pierce enlisted as a private and was soon promoted to brigadier general. After an accident resulted in injury during the Battle of Contreras, he resigned from the Army by 1848.

In 1971 the building was threatened with demolition as part of an urban renewal project. Locals created the "Pierce Brigade", an organization to raise funds to purchase and save the home. Due to their efforts, the building was moved from Montgomery Street in Concord to its present location at 14 Horseshoe Pond Lane (in 1971 known as Penacook Street). It was opened to the public in 1974.

The home is available for guided tours from mid-June to October. It continues to be operated by the Pierce Brigade.

== See also ==
- Franklin Pierce Homestead, an earlier home of Franklin Pierce
- Franklin Pierce House (South Main Street, Concord, New Hampshire), where Pierce died
- List of residences of presidents of the United States
- List of National Historic Landmarks in New Hampshire
- New Hampshire Historical Marker No. 125: The Pierce Manse
