= Franklin Pierce House (South Main Street, Concord, New Hampshire) =

Historic house in New Hampshire, United States

- U.S. National Register of Historic Places
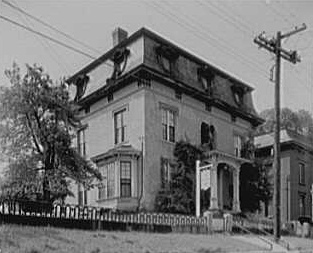
- The Pierce House in 1961, photo by Samuel Gottscho

- Location within New Hampshire Location within the United States
- Location: 52 S. Main St., Concord, New Hampshire
- Coordinates: 43°12′1″N 71°32′3″W
- Area: less than one acre
- Built: 1852
- Architectural style: Second Empire
- Demolished: September 17, 1981 (fire)
- NRHP reference No.: 79000318
- Added to NRHP: October 15, 1979

The Franklin Pierce House was a historic house at 52 South Main Street in Concord, New Hampshire, United States. Built in 1852, it was a significant local example of Second Empire architecture, and was one of two surviving Concord homes of President Franklin Pierce at the time of its listing on the National Register of Historic Places in 1979. Pierce died in the house in 1869. It was destroyed by fire on September 17, 1981.

== Description and history ==
The Franklin Pierce House stood south of downtown Concord, on the west side of South Main Street between Concord and Thorndike Streets, in a row of similar Italianate/Second Empire houses. It was three stories in height, its third floor under a mansard roof. It was built of brick, but its exterior had been stuccoed and scored to give the appearance of brownstone. The steep slope of the mansard roof had dormers with segmented-arch tops and pilastered sides. The main facade was three bays wide, with a center entrance sheltered by a portico with fluted square posts and a bracketed eave.

The building was constructed in 1852, and was originally built with Italianate styling and a flat roof. It was restyled later in the 19th century in the Second Empire style, adding the mansard roof. The house was most notable, however, for its association with United States President Franklin Pierce, who lived there with his family (as boarders of the owner, Willard Williams) intermittently after his departure from the White House. Writer Nathaniel Hawthorne visited Pierce there in 1864, shortly before his death, and Pierce died in the house on October 8, 1869.

Over 100 years later, the house was destroyed in a fire in 1981. The front steps and fence still exist as part of the property of the neighboring funeral home.

== See also ==
- National Register of Historic Places listings in Merrimack County, New Hampshire
- List of residences of presidents of the United States
