= Franklin Pierce rail accident =

Rail accident in 1853

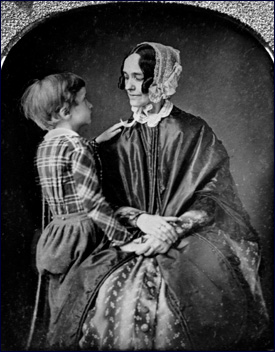
- Benjamin Pierce, son of Franklin and Jane Pierce, pictured with his mother

Details
- Date: January 6, 1853 (173 years ago); 1:00 p.m.
- Location: Andover, Massachusetts, U.S.
- Coordinates: 42°40′17″N 71°08′34″W
- Incident type: Derailment
- Cause: Broken axle

Statistics
- Trains: 1
- Deaths: 1

The Franklin Pierce rail accident was a train derailment in Andover, Massachusetts, on January 6, 1853, that resulted in the death of Benjamin "Benny" Pierce (born April 13, 1841), the last living child of United States president-elect Franklin Pierce.

== Background ==
In 1852, Franklin Pierce was elected as president to succeed Millard Fillmore. The election victory put an emotional strain on Jane Pierce, who had previously urged her husband to retire from politics. Franklin and Jane Pierce had previously lost two of their three sons; Franklin Jr. died in infancy while Frank Robert died at age four due to typhus. Benjamin Pierce (born April 13, 1841 in Concord, New Hampshire) was their sole child, aged 11 at the time.

== Accident ==
To celebrate both Christmas and Pierce's success in the 1852 presidential election, the small family set out for a Boston respite before his inauguration. After the vacation, in January 1853, the Pierce family was visiting Andover, Massachusetts, either to attend a funeral or as a vacation for the holidays. On January 6, the family was returning to Concord, New Hampshire, their hometown.

Pierce and his family boarded a two-car train and began their travel back to New Hampshire. At around 1:00 p.m., three miles (4.8 km) away from the Andover station (with one possible location being cited as "between Argyle and Arundel Street"), the train encountered fallen rocks on the tracks, and one of the train axles fractured. The coach that Pierce and his family were in derailed and fell 15 to 20 feet (4.6 to 6.1 m) down an embankment, destroying the car. Pierce's 11-year-old son, Benjamin, who was standing at the time, was the only fatality.

Pierce and his wife, Jane, did not sustain any severe injuries. Pierce immediately saw that his son had been nearly decapitated in the wreck and covered the body with cloth in an unsuccessful attempt to hide the sight from his wife.

== Aftermath ==
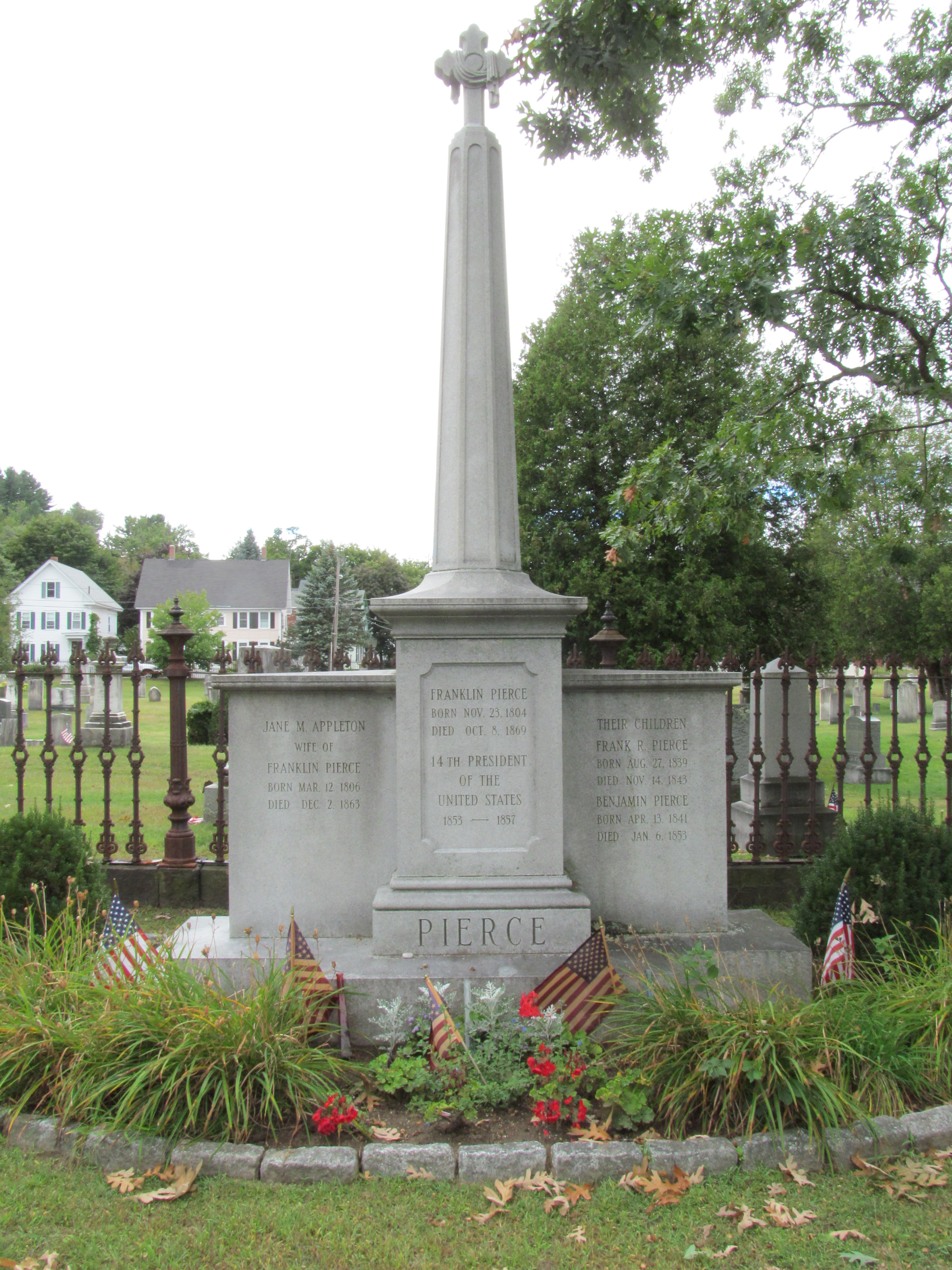
Grave of the Pierce family

News of the accident spread across the nation, but it was initially reported that Franklin Pierce was also among the fatalities of the wreck.

Benjamin was buried in the Old North Cemetery in Concord, the burial place of his brother Frank.

=== Effect on presidency ===
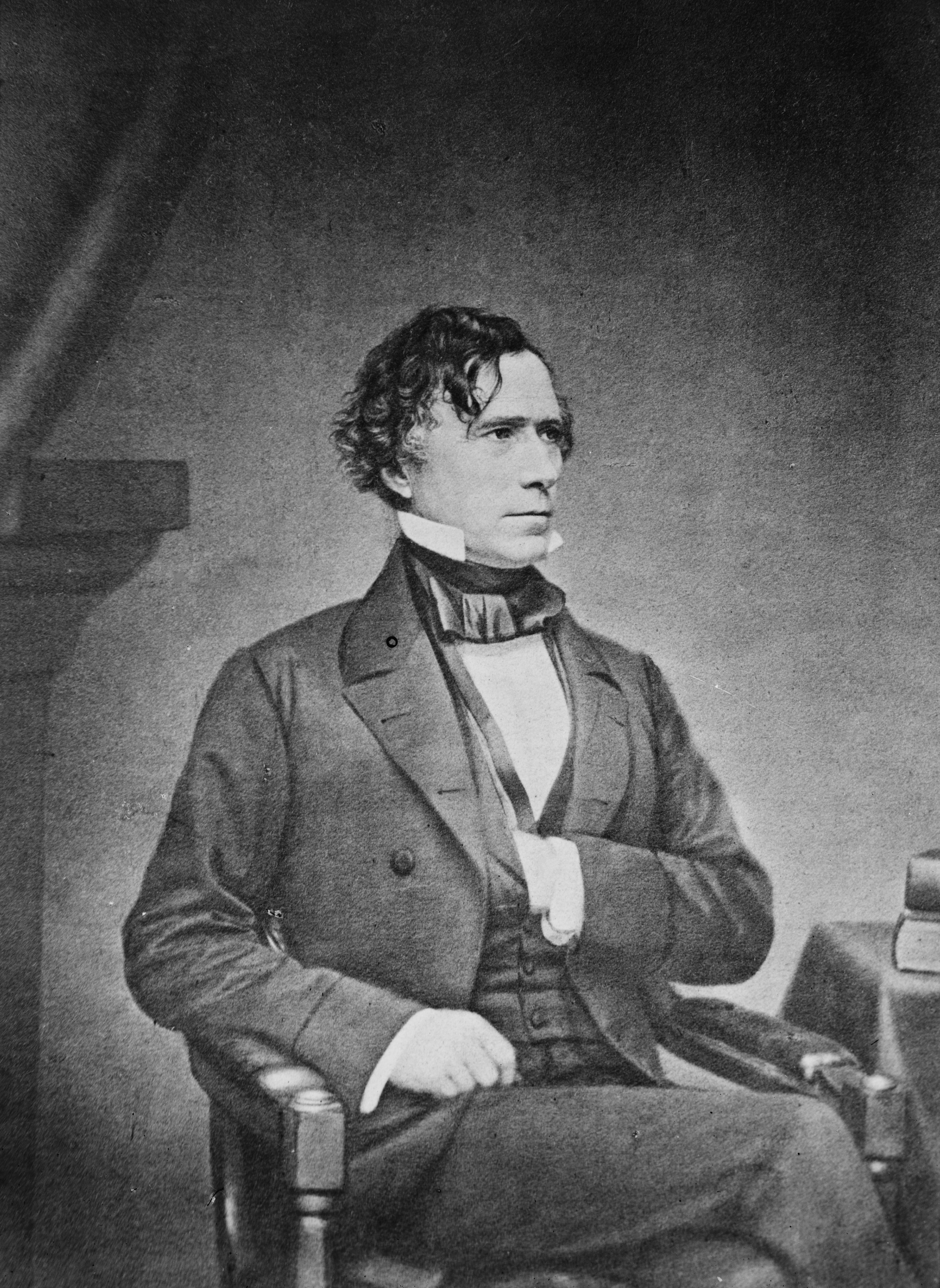
Then president-elect Franklin Pierce

Both Franklin and Jane were visibly affected by the accident. Pierce was described as being emotionally drained when his presidency began, while Jane was so distraught from the event that she did not attend the presidential inauguration, nor was she able to attend Benjamin's burial in Concord. In a personal letter, Franklin Pierce wrote that the accident had left him crushed, but he still felt an obligation to pursue his duties as the president. With the incoming First Lady not present at the inauguration, and Pierce's vice-president William R. King also unable to attend due to tuberculosis, the inaugural ball was canceled.

Pierce alluded to the impact the incident had on him in his inaugural address by saying:

My Countrymen: It is a relief to feel that no heart but my own can know the personal regret and bitter sorrow over which I have been borne to a position so suitable for others rather than desirable for myself.

Jane Pierce, raised a Puritan, believed that the accident was a punishment from God as a result of Franklin Pierce continuing his political aspirations against her wishes. Franklin Pierce also believed that the accident was a form of punishment from God so he refused to use a Bible when giving his oath of office.

When Jane Pierce finally moved into the White House, she spent a majority of her husband's presidency grieving and hiding upstairs. She allegedly wore all black for the rest of her life, spent time sending letters to her deceased son, Benjamin, and even held séances in an effort to communicate with him.

President Pierce, despite the grave tragedy did ride on a train at least once more in his life. It was written in Benjamin Perley's book that:

in 1855, the Orange and Alexandria Railroad was completed to Culpepper Court-House, Virginia, John S. Barbour, president of the road, invited a number of gentlemen to inspect it and partake of a barbecue. President Pierce, Mr. Bodisco, the Russian Minister, and other distinguished officials were of the invited guests. The party went to Alexandria by steamer, and on landing there found a train awaiting them, with a baggage-car fitted up as a lunch room. The President was in excellent spirits, and when the excursionists reached the place where the barbecue was held, he enjoyed a succession of anecdotes told by the best story tellers of the party.

It is believed that this accident, as well as the death of his wife Jane in 1863, accelerated Pierce's drinking habits. Pierce died of cirrhosis of the liver in 1869, aged 64.
