= Bibliography of Daniel Webster =

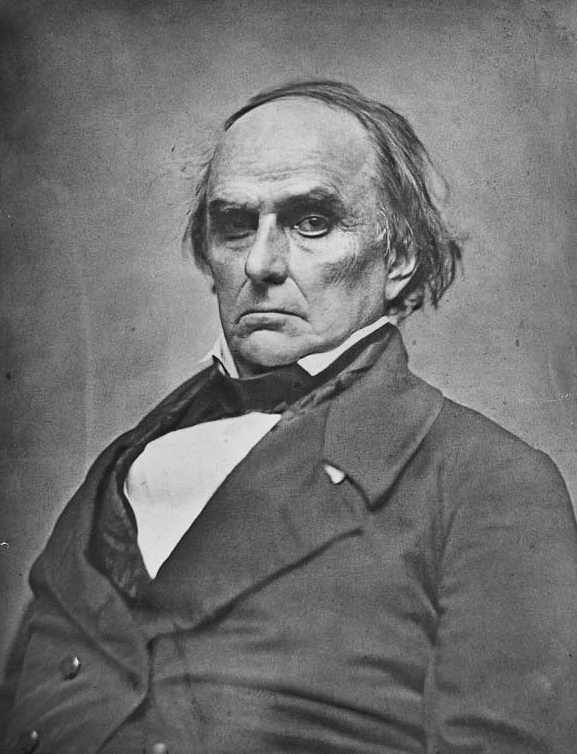
- Daguerreotype of Webster c. 1847

14th & 19th United States Secretary of State
- In office July 23, 1850 – October 24, 1852
- President: Millard Fillmore
- Preceded by: John M. Clayton
- Succeeded by: Edward Everett
- In office March 6, 1841 – May 8, 1843
- President: William Henry Harrison; John Tyler
- Preceded by: John Forsyth
- Succeeded by: Abel P. Upshur

United States Senator from Massachusetts
- In office March 4, 1845 – July 22, 1850
- Preceded by: Rufus Choate
- Succeeded by: Robert Charles Winthrop
- In office June 8, 1827 – February 22, 1841
- Preceded by: Elijah H. Mills
- Succeeded by: Rufus Choate
Committee chairmanships
Chair of the Senate Finance Committee
In office December 2, 1833 – December 5, 1836
Preceded by	John Forsyth
Succeeded by	Silas Wright
Chair of the House Judiciary Committee
In office 1823–1827
Preceded by	Hugh Nelson
Succeeded by	Philip P. Barbour

Member of the U.S. House of Representatives
- In office March 4, 1823 – May 30, 1827
- Preceded by: Benjamin Gorham
- Succeeded by: Benjamin Gorham
- Constituency: Massachusetts 1
- In office March 4, 1813 – March 3, 1817
- Preceded by: George Sullivan
- Succeeded by: Arthur Livermore
- Constituency: New Hampshire at-large

Personal details
- Born: January 18, 1782 Salisbury, New Hampshire, U.S.
- Died: October 24, 1852 (aged 70) Marshfield, Massachusetts, U.S.
- Party: Whig
- Other political affiliations: Federalist (before 1825); National Republican (1825–1833)
- Spouses: Grace Fletcher (m. 1808; died 1828); Caroline LeRoy Webster (m. 1829)
- Children: 5, including Fletcher
- Parent: Ebenezer Webster
- Education: Dartmouth College

- Coat of arms

This is a bibliography of works about and principle works by Daniel Webster.

Daniel Webster (January 18, 1782 – October 24, 1852) was an American lawyer, statesman, and diplomat who represented New Hampshire and Massachusetts in the U.S. Congress and served as the 14th and 19th U.S. secretary of state under presidents William Henry Harrison, John Tyler, and Millard Fillmore. Webster was one of the most prominent American lawyers of the 19th century, arguing over 200 cases before the United States Supreme Court in his career. During his life, Webster had been a member of the Federalist Party, the National Republican Party, and the Whig Party. He was one of the three members of the Great Triumvirate, with Henry Clay and John C. Calhoun.

Works listed here are cited in the notes or bibliographies of scholarly sources. Each is published by an academic or major press, written by a recognized expert, or substantially reviewed in scholarly journals; borderline cases are omitted. A selection of primary sources are included. Many of the books below carry their own bibliographies; see the Further reading section for other bibliographies, and the External links section for historical sites, academic sites, and museums.

Citations follow APA style. (Note: Entries are in plain text APA 7 format without templates; templates are used only for reviews and notes.) Book have citations to academic journal or mainstream published reviews when available. For books only partly about the subject, relevant chapter or section titles are provided when useful and available. Translators of the original-language edition are included when possible. In cases where a title or name has appeared with more than one English spelling, the most recent published form is used and a footnote documents any earlier title under which the work appeared.

== General works ==
- Bartlett, I. H. (1972). Daniel Webster as a symbolic hero. The New England Quarterly, 45(4), 484. JSTOR 364423
- Bartlett, I. H. (1978). Daniel Webster. Norton.
- Baxter, M. G. (1984). One and inseparable: Daniel Webster and the Union. Belknap Press of Harvard University Press.
- Brown, N. D. (1969). Daniel Webster and the politics of availability. University of Georgia Press.
- Current, R. N. (1955). Daniel Webster and the rise of national conservatism. Little, Brown.
- Dalzell, R. F. (1973). Daniel Webster and the trial of American nationalism, 1843–1852. Houghton Mifflin.
- Nathans, S. (1966). Daniel Webster, Massachusetts man. The New England Quarterly, 39(2), 161. JSTOR 363276
- Nathans, S. (1973). Daniel Webster and Jacksonian democracy. Johns Hopkins University Press.
- Parish, P. J. (1967). Daniel Webster, New England, and the West. The Journal of American History, 54(3), 524. JSTOR 2937405
- Paul, J. R. (2022). Indivisible: Daniel Webster and the birth of American nationalism. Riverhead Books.
- Peterson, M. D. (1987). The great triumvirate: Webster, Clay, and Calhoun. Oxford University Press.
- Remini, R. V. (1997). Daniel Webster: The man and his time. Norton.
- Shewmaker, K. E. (Ed.). (1990). Daniel Webster: "The completest man". University Press of New England.

== Topical works ==
=== Compromise of 1850 and slavery ===
- Blackett, R. J. M. (2018). The captive's quest for freedom: Fugitive slaves, the 1850 Fugitive Slave Law, and the politics of slavery. Cambridge University Press.
- Bordewich, F. M. (2012). America's great debate: Henry Clay, Stephen A. Douglas, and the compromise that preserved the Union. Simon & Schuster.
- Campbell, S. W. (1970). The slave catchers: Enforcement of the Fugitive Slave Law, 1850–1860. University of North Carolina Press.
- Delbanco, A. (2018). The war before the war: Fugitive slaves and the struggle for America's soul from the Revolution to the Civil War. Penguin Press.
- Foster, H. D. (1922). Webster's seventh of March speech and the secession movement, 1850. The American Historical Review, 27(2), 245–270. JSTOR 1836156
- Hamilton, H. (1964). Prologue to conflict: The crisis and compromise of 1850. University of Kentucky Press.
- Jones, H. (1975). The peculiar institution and national honor: The case of the Creole slave revolt. Civil War History, 21(1), 28–50. doi:10.1353/cwh.1975.0036
- Jones, H. (1987). Mutiny on the Amistad: The saga of a slave revolt and its impact on American abolition, law, and diplomacy. Oxford University Press.
- Kerr-Ritchie, J. R. (2019). Rebellious passage: The Creole revolt and America's coastal slave trade. Cambridge University Press.
- Remini, R. V. (2010). At the edge of the precipice: Henry Clay and the compromise that saved the Union. Basic Books.
- Reznick, S. M. (2017). On liberty and union: Moral imagination and its limits in Daniel Webster's seventh of March speech. American Political Thought, 6(3), 371–395. doi:10.1086/692572
- Wilson, M. L. (1968). Of time and the Union: Webster and his critics in the crisis of 1850. Civil War History, 14(4), 293–306. doi:10.1353/cwh.1968.0057

=== Diplomacy and foreign policy ===
- Current, R. N. (1947). Webster's propaganda and the Ashburton Treaty. The Mississippi Valley Historical Review, 34(2), 187. JSTOR 1896156
- Dunbabin, J. P. D. (2011). "Red lines on maps" revisited: The role of maps in negotiating and defending the 1842 Webster-Ashburton Treaty. Imago Mundi, 63(1), 39–61. doi:10.1080/03085694.2011.521330
- Jones, H. (1977). To the Webster-Ashburton Treaty: A study in Anglo-American relations, 1783–1843. University of North Carolina Press.
- Jones, H. (1987). Mutiny on the Amistad: The saga of a slave revolt and its impact on American abolition, law, and diplomacy. Oxford University Press.
- Jones, H., & Rakestraw, D. A. (1997). Prologue to manifest destiny: Anglo-American relations in the 1840s. SR Books.
- Jones, W. D. (1953). Lord Ashburton and the Maine boundary negotiations. The Mississippi Valley Historical Review, 40(3), 477. JSTOR 1891873
- LeDuc, T. (1964). The Webster-Ashburton Treaty and the Minnesota iron ranges. The Journal of American History, 51(3), 476–481. JSTOR 1894897
- Lucey, W. L. (1942). Some correspondence of the Maine commissioners regarding the Webster-Ashburton Treaty. The New England Quarterly, 15(2), 332. JSTOR 360530
- Rakestraw, D. A. (2018). Daniel Webster: Defender of peace. Rowman & Littlefield.
- Shewmaker, K. E. (1976). Daniel Webster and the politics of foreign policy, 1850–1852. The Journal of American History, 63(2), 303–315. JSTOR 1899638
- Shewmaker, K. E. (1977). "Untaught diplomacy": Daniel Webster and the Lobos Islands controversy. Diplomatic History, 1(4), 321–340. doi:10.1111/j.1467-7709.1977.tb00245.x
- Shewmaker, K. E. (1982). Daniel Webster and the Oregon question. Pacific Historical Review, 51(2), 195–201. JSTOR 3638529
- Shewmaker, K. E. (1985). "Hook and line, and bob and sinker": Daniel Webster and the fisheries dispute of 1852. Diplomatic History, 9(2), 113–129. doi:10.1111/j.1467-7709.1985.tb00526.x
- Shewmaker, K. E. (1988). "Congress only can declare war" and "The President is Commander in Chief": Daniel Webster and the war power. Diplomatic History, 12(4), 383–410. doi:10.1111/j.1467-7709.1988.tb00034.x

=== Political philosophy ===
- Baxter, M. G. (1960). Should the Dartmouth College case have been reargued? The New England Quarterly, 33(1), 19. JSTOR 362962
- Baxter, M. G. (1966). Daniel Webster & the Supreme Court. University of Massachusetts Press.
- Botein, S. (1985). Love of gold and other ruling passions: The legal papers of Daniel Webster. American Bar Foundation Research Journal, 10(1), 217–229. doi:10.1111/j.1747-4469.1985.tb00506.x
- Ellis, R. E. (2007). Aggressive nationalism: McCulloch v. Maryland and the foundation of federal authority in the young republic. Oxford University Press.
- Hoffer, P. C. (2021). Daniel Webster and the unfinished Constitution. University Press of Kansas.
- Newmyer, R. K. (1967). Daniel Webster as Tocqueville's lawyer: The Dartmouth College case again. American Journal of Legal History, 11(2), 127–147. JSTOR 844243
- Newmyer, R. K. (1985). Supreme Court Justice Joseph Story: Statesman of the old republic. University of North Carolina Press.
- Simpson, B. D. (1992). Daniel Webster and the cult of the Constitution. Journal of American Culture, 15(1), 15–23. doi:10.1111/j.1542-734x.1992.00015.x
- Stites, F. N. (1972). Private interest and public gain: The Dartmouth College case, 1819. University of Massachusetts Press.
- Thomas, G. (2015). Rethinking the Dartmouth College case in American political development: Constituting public and private educational institutions. Studies in American Political Development, 29(1), 23–39. doi:10.1017/s0898588x14000121
- Wheeler, E. P. (1904). Constitutional law of the United States as moulded by Daniel Webster. The Yale Law Journal, 13(7), 366. JSTOR 781747

=== Oratory and rhetoric ===
- Arntson, P., & Smith, C. R. (1975). The seventh of March address: A mediating influence. Southern Speech Communication Journal, 40(3), 288–301. doi:10.1080/10417947509372272
- Eisenstadt, A. A. (1954). Daniel Webster and the seventh of March. The Southern Speech Journal, 20(2), 136–147. doi:10.1080/10417945409371349
- Fields, W. (1983). The reply to Hayne. Political Theory, 11(1), 5–28. doi:10.1177/0090591783011001002
- Hoffer, P. C. (2025). Three speeches that saved the Union: Clay, Calhoun, Webster, and the crisis of 1850. New York University Press.
- Merk, F., & Merk, L. B. (1971). Fruits of propaganda in the Tyler administration. Harvard University Press.
- Mills, G. E. (1943). Misconceptions concerning Daniel Webster. Quarterly Journal of Speech, 29(4), 423–428. doi:10.1080/00335634309380920
- Sayer, J. E. (1979). Webster v. Hayne: A reanalysis of motive. Central States Speech Journal, 30(3), 241–249. doi:10.1080/10510977909368017
- Smith, C. R. (1989). Defender of the Union: The oratory of Daniel Webster. Greenwood Press.
- Smith, C. R. (1999). The anti-war rhetoric of Daniel Webster. Quarterly Journal of Speech, 85(1), 1–16. doi:10.1080/00335639909384238
- Smith, C. R. (2005). Daniel Webster and the oratory of civil religion. University of Missouri Press.

=== Industrialization ===
- Prince, C. E., & Taylor, S. (1982). Daniel Webster, the Boston Associates, and the U.S. government's role in the industrializing process, 1815–1830. Journal of the Early Republic, 2(3), 283. JSTOR 3122975

== Background ==
- Childers, C. (2018). The Webster-Hayne debate: Defining nationhood in the early American republic. Johns Hopkins University Press.
- Dubofsky, M. (1969). Daniel Webster and the Whig theory of economic growth: 1828–1848. The New England Quarterly, 42(4), 551. JSTOR 363471
- Ericson, D. F. (1995). The nullification crisis, American republicanism, and the Force Bill debate. The Journal of Southern History, 61(2), 249. JSTOR 2211577
- Freehling, W. W. (1966). Prelude to Civil War: The nullification controversy in South Carolina, 1816–1836. Harper & Row.
- Hammond, B. (1957). Banks and politics in America from the Revolution to the Civil War. Princeton University Press.
- Holt, M. F. (1999). The rise and fall of the American Whig Party: Jacksonian politics and the onset of the Civil War. Oxford University Press.
- Howe, D. W. (1979). The political culture of the American Whigs. University of Chicago Press.
- Sheidley, H. W. (1994). The Webster-Hayne debate: Recasting New England's sectionalism. The New England Quarterly, 67(1), 5. JSTOR 366457
- Sheidley, H. W. (1998). Sectional nationalism: Massachusetts conservative leaders and the transformation of America, 1815–1836. Northeastern University Press.
- Varon, E. R. (2008). Disunion! The coming of the American Civil War, 1789–1859. University of North Carolina Press.

== Miscellaneous ==
- Chu, J. M. (2000). The demon and Daniel Webster: Drinking in the antebellum Senate. American Nineteenth Century History, 1(2), 97–104. doi:10.1080/14664650008567018
- Mondale, C. (1962). Daniel Webster and technology. American Quarterly, 14(1), 37. JSTOR 2710225

== Older works ==
- Curtis, G. T. (1889). Life of Daniel Webster (Vols. 1–2). D. Appleton.
- Fuess, C. M. (1930). Daniel Webster (Vols. 1–2). Little, Brown.
- Lodge, H. C. (1883). Daniel Webster. Houghton, Mifflin.

== Primary sources ==
=== Collected editions and papers ===
- Webster, D. (1848). The diplomatic and official papers of Daniel Webster, while secretary of state. Harper & Brothers.
- Webster, D. (1857). The private correspondence of Daniel Webster (F. Webster, Ed.; Vols. 1–2). Little, Brown.
- Webster, D. (1879). The great speeches and orations of Daniel Webster (E. P. Whipple, Ed.). Little, Brown.
- Webster, D. (1903). The writings and speeches of Daniel Webster (National ed., Vols. 1–18). Little, Brown.
- Webster, D. (1971). Microfilm edition of the papers of Daniel Webster (C. M. Wiltse, Ed.). University Microfilms, in collaboration with Dartmouth College Library.
- Webster, D. (1975). The papers of Daniel Webster: Series 1. Correspondence (C. M. Wiltse, H. D. Moser, D. G. Allen, W. B. Tilghman, & M. J. Birkner, Eds.; Vols. 1–7, 1975–1986). University Press of New England.
- Webster, D. (1982). The papers of Daniel Webster: Series 2. Legal papers (A. S. Konefsky & A. J. King, Eds.; Vols. 1–3, 1982–1989). University Press of New England.
- Webster, D. (1983). The papers of Daniel Webster: Series 3. Diplomatic papers (K. E. Shewmaker & K. R. Stevens, Eds.; Vols. 1–2, 1983–1988). University Press of New England.
- Webster, D. (1987). The papers of Daniel Webster: Series 4. Speeches and formal writings (C. M. Wiltse & A. R. Berolzheimer, Eds.; Vols. 1–2, 1987–1988). University Press of New England.
- Webster, D. (1989). The papers of Daniel Webster: General index (A. R. Berolzheimer, Ed.). University Press of New England.

=== Major speeches and public papers ===
- Webster, D. (1800). An oration, pronounced at Hanover, New-Hampshire, the 4th day of July, 1800; being the twenty-fourth anniversary of American independence. Moses Davis.
- Webster, D. (1821). A discourse, delivered at Plymouth, December 22, 1820: In commemoration of the first settlement of New-England (2nd ed.). Wells and Lilly.
- Webster, D. (1825). An address delivered at the laying of the corner stone of the Bunker Hill Monument (2nd ed.). Cummings, Hilliard.
- Webster, D. (1826). A discourse in commemoration of the lives and services of John Adams and Thomas Jefferson: Delivered in Faneuil Hall, Boston, August 2, 1826. Cummings, Hilliard.
- Webster, D. (1830). Second reply to Hayne [Speech delivered in the United States Senate, January 26–27, 1830]. United States Senate.
- Webster, D., & Ashburton, Lord. (1842a). A treaty to settle and define the boundaries between the territories of the United States and the possessions of Her Britannic Majesty, in North America. Avalon Project, Yale Law School.
- Webster, D., & Ashburton, Lord. (1842b). British-American diplomacy: The Caroline case. Avalon Project, Yale Law School.
- Webster, D. (1843). Address, delivered at Bunker Hill, June 17, 1843, on the completion of the monument. T. R. Marvin.
- Webster, D. (1850). Speech of Hon. Daniel Webster, on Mr. Clay's resolutions: In the Senate of the United States, March 7, 1850. Gideon.

== See also ==
- Origins of the American Civil War
- Great Triumvirate
- Bibliography of John Tyler
- Bibliography of Millard Fillmore
- Bibliography of Franklin Pierce
- Bibliography of John C. Calhoun
