= Bibliography of South Carolina history =

South Carolina history bibliography

This is a bibliography of South Carolina history. It contains English language (including translations) books and mainstream academic journal articles published after World War II.

Works listed here are cited in the notes or bibliographies of scholarly sources. Each is published by an academic or major press, written by a recognized expert, or substantially reviewed in scholarly journals; borderline cases are omitted. A selection of primary sources are included. Many of the books below carry their own bibliographies; see the Further reading section for other bibliographies, and the External links section for historical sites, academic sites, and museums.

Citations follow APA style. (Note: Entries are in plain text APA 7 format without templates; templates are used only for reviews and notes.) Book have citations to academic journal or mainstream published reviews when available. For books only partly about the subject, relevant chapter or section titles are provided when useful and available. Translators of the original-language edition are included when possible. In cases where a title or name has appeared with more than one English spelling, the most recent published form is used and a footnote documents any earlier title under which the work appeared.

== General works ==
- Edgar, W. (1998). South Carolina: A History. University of South Carolina Press.
- Tullos, A. (1989). Habits of industry: White culture and the transformation of the Carolina Piedmont. University of North Carolina Press.
- Wallace, D. D. (1951). South Carolina: A Short History, 1520–1948. University of North Carolina Press.
- Wright, L. B. (1976). South Carolina: A Bicentennial History. W. W. Norton & Company.

== Chronological ==
=== Colonial era ===
- Adams, G. R. (1972). The Carolina Regulators: A Note on Changing Interpretations. The North Carolina Historical Review, 49(4), 345–352.
- Carney, J. (1996). Rice Milling, Gender and Slave Labour in Colonial South Carolina. Past & Present, 153, 108–134.
- Coclanis, P. A. (2005). Global Perspectives on the Early Economic History of South Carolina. South Carolina Historical Magazine, 106, 130–146.
- Dunn, R. S. (1971). The English Sugar Islands and the Founding of South Carolina. The South Carolina Historical Magazine, 72(2), 81–93.
- Greene, J. P. (1987). Colonial South Carolina and the Caribbean Connection. The South Carolina Historical Magazine, 88(4), 192–210.
- Hart, E. (2015). Building Charleston: Town and Society in the Eighteenth Century British Atlantic World. University of South Carolina Press.
- Haw, J. (2002). Political Representation in South Carolina, 1669-1794: Evolution of a Lowcountry Tradition. The South Carolina Historical Magazine, 103(2), 106–129.
- Haywood, C. R. (1959). Mercantilism and South Carolina Agriculture, 1700-1763. The South Carolina Historical Magazine, 60(1), 15–27.
- Johnson, D. A. (2013). The Regulation Reconsidered: Shared Grievances In The Colonial Carolinas. The South Carolina Historical Magazine, 114(2), 132–154.
- Johnson Jr., G. L. (1997). The Frontier in the Colonial South: South Carolina Backcountry, 1736–1800. Praeger/University of South Carolina Press.
- Littlefield, D. C. (2000). The Slave Trade to Colonial South Carolina: A Profile. The South Carolina Historical Magazine, 101(2), 110–141.
- Lockley, T. (2005). Rural Poor Relief in Colonial South Carolina. The Historical Journal, 48(4), 955–976.
- Meaders, D. E. (1975). South Carolina Fugitives as Viewed Through Local Colonial Newspapers with Emphasis on Runaway Notices 1732-1801. The Journal of Negro History, 60(2), 288–319.
- Moore, P. N. (2022). Carolina’s Lost Colony: Stuarts Town and the Struggle for Survival in Early South Carolina. University of South Carolina Press.
- Navin, J. J. (2019). The Grim Years: Settling South Carolina, 1670-1720. University of South Carolina Press.
- Oatis, S. J. (2004). A colonial complex: South Carolina's frontiers in the era of the Yamasee War, 1680–1730. University of Nebraska Press.
- Otto, J. S. (1986). The Origins of Cattle-Ranching in Colonial South Carolina, 1670-1715. The South Carolina Historical Magazine, 87(2), 117–124.
- Roper, L. H. (2004). Conceiving Carolina: Proprietors, Planters, and Plots, 1662–1729. Palgrave Macmillan.
- Rowland, L. S., Moore, A. (1996). The History of Beaufort County, South Carolina: 1514-1861. University of South Carolina Press.
- Sirmans, M. E. (1966). Politics in Colonial South Carolina: The Failure of Proprietary Reform, 1682-1694. The William and Mary Quarterly, 23(1), 33–55.
- Sirmans, M. E. (2012). Colonial South Carolina: A Political History, 1663-1763. Omohundro Institute and UNC Press.
- Smith, W. B. (1961). White Servitude in Colonial South Carolina. University of South Carolina Press.
- Vecchio, D. C. (2024). Peddlers, Merchants, and Manufacturers: How Jewish Entrepreneurs Built Economy and Community in Upcountry South Carolina. University of South Carolina Press.
- Weir, R. M. (1997). Colonial South Carolina: A History. University of South Carolina Press.
- Wilson, T. D. (2016). The Ashley Cooper Plan: The Founding of Carolina and the Origins of Southern Political Culture. University of North Carolina Press.
- Wood, P. H. (1996). Black Majority: Negroes in Colonial South Carolina from 1670 Through the Stono Rebellion. W. W. Norton & Company.

=== Revolutionary era ===
- Andrew Jr., R. (2012). Andrew Pickens: South Carolina Patriot in the Revolutionary War. McFarland & Company.
- Andrew, R. (2017). The Life and Times of General Andrew Pickens: Revolutionary War Hero, American Founder (Illustrated edition). The University of North Carolina Press.
- Brannon, R. (2016). From Revolution to Reunion: The Reintegration of the South Carolina Loyalists. University of South Carolina Press.
- Chaplin, J. E. (1991). Creating a Cotton South in Georgia and South Carolina, 1760–1815. Journal of Southern History, 57(2), 171–200.
- Farley, M. F. (1978). The South Carolina Negro in the American Revolution, 1775-1783. The South Carolina Historical Magazine, 79(2), 75–86.
- Gordon, J. W. (2002). South Carolina and the American Revolution: A Battlefield History. University of South Carolina Press.
- Lander, E. M. Jr. (1956). The South Carolinians at the Philadelphia Convention, 1787. South Carolina Historical Magazine, 57(3), 134–155.
- Lipscomb, T. W. (1976). The South Carolina Constitution of 1776. The South Carolina Historical Magazine, 77(2), 138–141.
- Oller, J. (2010). The Swamp Fox: How Francis Marion Saved the American Revolution. Da Capo Press.
- Swan, P. G. (2007). “The Present Defenceless State of the Country”: Gunpowder Plots in Revolutionary South Carolina. The South Carolina Historical Magazine, 108(4), 297–315.

=== Early Republic to the Civil War ===
- Chaplin, J. E. (1991). Creating a Cotton South in Georgia and South Carolina, 1760–1815. Journal of Southern History, 57(2), 171–200.
- Ford Jr., L. K. (1988). Origins of Southern Radicalism: The South Carolina Upcountry, 1800–1860. Oxford University Press.
- Kinard Latimer, M. (1956). South Carolina—A Protagonist of the War of 1812. The American Historical Review, 61(4), 914–929. https://doi.org/10.2307/1848824
- Mancall, P. C., Rosenbloom, J. L., & Weiss, T. (2001). Slave Prices and the South Carolina Economy, 1722-1809. The Journal of Economic History, 61(3), 616–639.
- Marks, J. G. (2020). Black Freedom in the Age of Slavery: Race, Status, and Identity in the Urban Americas. University of South Carolina Press.
- Meaders, D. E. (1975). South Carolina Fugitives as Viewed Through Local Colonial Newspapers with Emphasis on Runaway Notices 1732-1801. The Journal of Negro History, 60(2), 288–319.
- Megginson, W. J., & Burton, O. V. (2022). African American Life in South Carolina’s Upper Piedmont, 1780-1900 (2nd edition). University of South Carolina Press.
- Ochenkowski, J. P. (1982). The Origins of Nullification in South Carolina. The South Carolina Historical Magazine, 83(2), 121–153.
- Rogers, T. W. (1967). The Great Population Exodus from South Carolina 1850-1860. The South Carolina Historical Magazine, 68(1), 14–21.
- Schweninger, L. (1992). Slave Independence and Enterprise in South Carolina, 1780-1865. The South Carolina Historical Magazine, 93(2), 101–125.
- Sinha, M. (2000). The Counterrevolution of Slavery: Politics and Ideology in Antebellum South Carolina. University of North Carolina Press.

=== Civil War and Reconstruction ===
- Burton, V. (1978). Race and Reconstruction: Edgefield County, South Carolina. Journal of Social History, 12(1), 31–56.
- Channing, S. (1974). Crisis of Fear: Secession in South Carolina. W. W. Norton & Company
- Ford, L. K. (1984). Rednecks and Merchants: Economic Development and Social Tensions in the South Carolina Upcountry, 1865–1900. Journal of American History, 71(1), 294–318.
- Gatewood, W. B. (1991). “The Remarkable Misses Rollin”: Black Women in Reconstruction South Carolina. The South Carolina Historical Magazine, 92(3), 172–188.
- Hine, W. C. (1983). Black Politicians in Reconstruction Charleston, South Carolina: A Collective Study. The Journal of Southern History, 49(4), 555–584.
- Holt, T. (1977). Black over White: Negro political leadership in South Carolina during Reconstruction. University of Illinois Press.
- Holt, T. C. (1982). Negro State Legislators in South Carolina during Reconstruction. University of Illinois Press.
- Koivusalo, A. (2022). The Man Who Started the Civil War: James Chesnut, Honor, and Emotion in the American South. University of South Carolina Press.
- Powers, B. E. Jr. (2011). "'The Worst of All Barbarism': Racial Anxiety and the Approach of Secession in the Palmetto State." South Carolina Historical Magazine, 112, 139–156.
- Shapiro, H. (1964). The Ku Klux Klan During Reconstruction: The South Carolina Episode. The Journal of Negro History, 49(1), 34–55.
- Schultz, H. S. (1969). Nationalism and Sectionalism in South Carolina, 1852–1860. University of Illinois Press.
- Williamson, J. R. (1965). After Slavery: The Negro in South Carolina during Reconstruction, 1861–1877. W.W. Norton & Company.

==== Civil War military histories ====
- Detzer, D. (2001). Allegiance: Fort Sumter, Charleston, and the beginning of the Civil War. Harcourt.
- Emerson, W. E. (2005). Sons of Privilege: The Charleston Light Dragoons in the Civil War. University of South Carolina Press.
- Latzko, D. A. (2015). Mapping The Short-Run Impact Of The Civil War And Emancipation On The South Carolina Economy. The South Carolina Historical Magazine, 116(4), 258–279.
- Lucas, M. B. (1976). Sherman and the Burning of Columbia (1st edition). Texas A&M University.

=== Post Reconstruction ===
- Bedingfield, S. (2011). John H. McCray, Accommodationism, and the Framing of the Civil Rights Struggle in South Carolina, 1940–48. Journalism History, 37(2), 91–101.
- Carlton, D. L. (1982). Mill and Town in South Carolina, 1880–1920. Louisiana State University Press.
- Cooper Jr., W. J. (1968). The Conservative Regime: South Carolina, 1877–1890. Johns Hopkins University Press.
- Edgar, W. B. (2012). South Carolina in the Modern Age (Illustrated edition). University of South Carolina Press.
- Ford, L. K. (1984). Rednecks and Merchants: Economic Development and Social Tensions in the South Carolina Upcountry, 1865–1900. Journal of American History, 71(1), 294–318.
- Haram, K. M. (2006). The Palmetto Leader’s Mission to End Lynching in South Carolina: Black Agency and the Black Press in Columbia, 1925-1940. The South Carolina Historical Magazine, 107(4), 310–333.
- Gmelch, G. (2015). Southern Exposure: Life in the Carolina League in the Time of Jim Crow. Journal of Sport History, 42(3).
- Griffith, N. S., & Raynal, C. E. (2016). Presbyterians in South Carolina, 1925-1985. Wipf and Stock.
- Hartness, C. L. T. (2023). “Our Country First, Then Greenville”: A New South City during the Progressive Era and World War I. University of South Carolina Press.
- Hine, W. C. (2018). South Carolina State University: A Black Land-Grant College in Jim Crow America. University of South Carolina Press.
- Simon, B. (1998). A Fabric of Defeat: The Politics of South Carolina Millhands, 1910–1948. University of North Carolina Press.

== Topical ==
=== Education ===
- Bartels, Virginia B. "The History of South Carolina Schools" (Center for Educator Recruitment, Retention, and Advancement, 2005) online
- Easterby, J. H. "The South Carolina Education Bill of 1770." South Carolina Historical and Genealogical Magazine 48.2 (1947): 95–111. online
- Lesesne, Henry H. A history of the University of South Carolina, 1940-2000 ( U of South Carolina Press, 2001) online.
- Meriwether, Colyer. History of Higher Education in South Carolina: With a Sketch of the Free School System. 1888 (US Government Printing Office, 1889) online.
- Southern Regional Education Board. 2012 South Carolina Progress Report (2012) online
- Walker, John, et al. eds. The Organization of Public Education in South Carolina (1992)

=== Slavery and Jim Crow ===
- Boyce, T. D. (2023). Steady and Measured: Benner C. Turner, A Black College President in the Jim Crow South. University of South Carolina Press.
- Carney, J. (1996). Rice Milling, Gender and Slave Labour in Colonial South Carolina'. Past & Present, 153, 108–134.
- Carney, J. A. (2002). Black Rice: The African Origins of Rice Cultivation in the Americas. Harvard University Press.
- Chaplin, J. E. (1991). Creating a Cotton South in Georgia and South Carolina, 1760–1815. Journal of Southern History, 57(2), 171–200.
- Coggeshall, J. M. (2018). Liberia, South Carolina: An African American Appalachian Community (Illustrated edition). The University of North Carolina Press.
- Faber, E. (2021). The Child in the Electric Chair: The Execution of George Junius Stinney Jr. and the Making of a Tragedy in the American South. University of South Carolina Press.
- Greene, J. P. (1987). Colonial South Carolina and the Caribbean Connection. The South Carolina Historical Magazine, 88(4), 192–210.
- Hine, W. C. (2018). South Carolina State University: A Black Land-Grant College in Jim Crow America. University of South Carolina Press.
- Kantrowitz, S. (2000). Ben Tillman and the Reconstruction of White Supremacy. University of North Carolina Press.
- Littlefield, D. C. (2000). The Slave Trade to Colonial South Carolina: A Profile. The South Carolina Historical Magazine, 101(2), 110–141.
- Mancall, P. C., Rosenbloom, J. L., & Weiss, T. (2001). Slave Prices and the South Carolina Economy, 1722-1809. The Journal of Economic History, 61(3), 616–639.
- Marks, J. G. (2020). Black Freedom in the Age of Slavery: Race, Status, and Identity in the Urban Americas. University of South Carolina Press.
- Schweninger, L. (1992). Slave Independence and Enterprise in South Carolina, 1780-1865. The South Carolina Historical Magazine, 93(2), 101–125.
- Sinha, M. (2000). The Counterrevolution of Slavery: Politics and Ideology in Antebellum South Carolina. University of North Carolina Press.
- Wood, P. H. (1996). Black Majority: Negroes in Colonial South Carolina from 1670 Through the Stono Rebellion. W. W. Norton & Company.

=== Civil Rights ===
- Bedingfield, S. (2011). John H. McCray, Accommodationism, and the Framing of the Civil Rights Struggle in South Carolina, 1940–48. Journalism History, 37(2), 91–101.
- Grose, P. G. (2006). South Carolina at the Brink: Robert McNair and the Politics of Civil Rights. University of South Carolina Press.
- Thomas, J. M. (2022). Struggling to learn: An intimate history of school desegregation in South Carolina. University of South Carolina Press.

=== Women and family ===
- Burton, O. V. (1985). In My Father's House Are Many Mansions: Family and Community in Edgefield, South Carolina. University of North Carolina Press.
- Gatewood, W. B. (1991). “The Remarkable Misses Rollin”: Black Women in Reconstruction South Carolina. The South Carolina Historical Magazine, 92(3), 172–188. http://www.jstor.org/stable/27568239
- Spruill, M. J. et al. (Eds.). (2009–2012). South Carolina Women: Their Lives and Times (3 vols.). University of Georgia Press.

=== Indigenous peoples of South Carolina ===
- Bauer, B. M. (2022). Becoming Catawba: Catawba Indian women and nation-building, 1540–1840 (Indians and Southern History). University of Alabama Press.
- Bossy, D. I., & Gallay, A. (Eds.). (2021). The Yamasee Indians: From Florida to South Carolina. University of Nebraska Press.
- Cashin, E. J. (2009). Guardians of the Valley: Chickasaws in Colonial South Carolina and Georgia. University of South Carolina Press.
- Hutcheson, B. G. (2023). Southern shepherds and savage wolves: Presbyterian missions and the American Indian, 1750–1837. University of South Carolina Press.
- Johnson, D. A. (2024). Enslaved Native Americans and the Making of Colonial South Carolina. Johns Hopkins University Press.
- Kupperman, K. O. (2023). Manteo's world: Native American life in Carolina's Sound Country before and after the Lost Colony. University of North Carolina Press.
- Oatis, S. J. (2004). A colonial complex: South Carolina's frontiers in the era of the Yamasee War, 1680–1730. University of Nebraska Press.
- Perdue, T. (2007). American Indian Survival in South Carolina. The South Carolina Historical Magazine, 108(3), 215–234.
- Ricky, D. (2001). Encyclopedia of South Carolina Indians (2vols.). Somerset Publishers.

=== Religion ===
- Clarke, E. (1996). Our Southern Zion: A History of Calvinism in the South Carolina Low Country, 1690–1990. University of Alabama Press.
- Hutcheson, B. G. (2023). Southern shepherds and savage wolves: Presbyterian missions and the American Indian, 1750–1837. University of South Carolina Press.

=== Urban history ===
- Butler, C. R. (2020). Lowcountry at High Tide: A History of Flooding, Drainage, and Reclamation in Charleston, South Carolina. University of South Carolina Press.
- Carlton, D. L. (1982). Mill and Town in South Carolina, 1880–1920. Louisiana State University Press.
- Hart, E. (2015). Building Charleston: Town and Society in the Eighteenth Century British Atlantic World. University of South Carolina Press.
- Marks, J. G. (2020). Black Freedom in the Age of Slavery: Race, Status, and Identity in the Urban Americas. University of South Carolina Press.
- Rosen, R. N. (2021). A Short History of Charleston (Revised and expanded edition). University of South Carolina Press.

=== Miscellaneous ===
- Coclanis, P. A. (2005). Global Perspectives on the Early Economic History of South Carolina. South Carolina Historical Magazine, 106, 130–146.
- Feeser, A. (2013). Red, White, and Black Make Blue: Indigo in the Fabric of Colonial South Carolina Life. University of Georgia Press.
- Nagl, D. (2013). No Part of the Mother Country, but Distinct Dominions - Law, State Formation and Governance in England, Massachusetts and South Carolina, 1630–1769. Verlag.
- Tuten, J. H. (2010). Lowcountry Time and Tide: The Fall of the South Carolina Rice Kingdom. University of South Carolina Press.
- Winberry, J. J. (1979). Reputation of Carolina Indigo. The South Carolina Historical Magazine, 80(3), 242–250.

== Biography ==
- Andrew Jr., R. (2012). Andrew Pickens: South Carolina Patriot in the Revolutionary War. McFarland & Company.
- Andrew, R. (2017). The Life and Times of General Andrew Pickens: Revolutionary War Hero, American Founder (Illustrated edition). The University of North Carolina Press.
- Bass, J., & Thompson, M. W. (2003). Ol' Strom: An unauthorized biography of Strom Thurmond. Little, Brown and Company.
- Brock, E. W. (1981). Thomas W. Cardozo: Fallible Black Reconstruction Leader. Journal of Southern History, 47(2), 183–206.
- Boyce, T. D. (2023). Steady and Measured: Benner C. Turner, A Black College President in the Jim Crow South. University of South Carolina Press.
- Cheek Jr., H. L. (2004). Calhoun and Popular Rule: The Political Theory of the Disquisition and Discourse. University of Missouri Press.
- Curran, R. E. (Ed.). (2019). For Church and Confederacy: The Lynches of South Carolina. University of South Carolina Press.
- Faber, E. (2021). The Child in the Electric Chair: The Execution of George Junius Stinney Jr. and the Making of a Tragedy in the American South. University of South Carolina Press.
- Grose, P. G. (2006). South Carolina at the Brink: Robert McNair and the Politics of Civil Rights. University of South Carolina Press.
- Kantrowitz, S. (2000). Ben Tillman and the Reconstruction of White Supremacy. University of North Carolina Press.
- Keyserling, H. (1998). Against the tide: One woman's political struggle. University of South Carolina Press.
- Koivusalo, A. (2022). The Man Who Started the Civil War: James Chesnut, Honor, and Emotion in the American South. University of South Carolina Press.
- Lamson, P. (1973). The Glorious Failure: Black Congressman Robert Brown Elliott and the Reconstruction in South Carolina. W.W. Norton & Company.
- Moulton, D. (2000). Christopher Gadsden and Henry Laurens: The Parallel Lives of Two American Patriots. Susquehanna University Press.
- Niven, J. (1988). John C. Calhoun and the Price of Union: A Biography. Louisiana State University Press.
- Oller, J. (2010). The Swamp Fox: How Francis Marion Saved the American Revolution. Da Capo Press.
- Rogers, G. C. (1962). Evolution of a Federalist: William Loughton Smith of Charleston (1758–1812). University of South Carolina Press.
- Scarborough, W. K. (2011). Propagandists for Secession: Edmund Ruffin of Virginia and Robert Barnwell Rhett of South Carolina. South Carolina Historical Magazine, 112, 126–138.

== Regional works ==
This section includes regional studies of what is now the southeastern United States which include substantial content about South Carolina.

- Brown, D. C. (2011). King Cotton: A cultural, political, and economic history since 1945. University Press of Mississippi.
- Crane, V. W. (1956). The Southern Frontier, 1670–1732. University of Michigan Press.
- Edwards, L. F., & Sensbach, J. F. (2023). A New History of the American South (W. F. Brundage, Ed.). The University of North Carolina Press.
- Foner, E. (2014). Reconstruction Updated Edition: America’s Unfinished Revolution, 1863-1877. Harper Perennial Modern Classics.
- Peirce, N. R. (1974). The Deep South States of America: People, Politics, and Power in the Seven Deep South States, 1960–72. W. W. Norton & Company.
- Sublette, N., & Sublette, C. (2015). The American Slave Coast: A History of the Slave-Breeding Industry. Lawrence Hill Books.

== Historiography and bibliographies ==
- Macaulay, N. W. (1964). South Carolina Reconstruction Historiography. The South Carolina Historical Magazine, 65(1), 20–32.

== Reference works ==
- Edgar, W. (Ed.). (2006). The South Carolina Encyclopedia. University of South Carolina Press.
- Edgar, W., Morris, J. B., Taylor, C. J., & Jr, G. C. R. (Eds.). (2020). A South Carolina Chronology (3rd edition). University of South Carolina Press.
- Ricky, D. (2001). Encyclopedia of South Carolina Indians (2vols.). Somerset Publishers.

== Academic journals ==
- The South Carolina Historical Magazine, (JSTOR) South Carolina Historial Society.
- Journal of Southern History, (JSTOR), Southern Historical Association.

== Primary sources ==
This section contains a limited list of primary sources related to South Carolina history.

=== Print ===
- Ashton, S. (Ed.). (2010). I Belong to South Carolina: South Carolina Slave Narratives. University of South Carolina Press.
- Hemphill, W. E. (Ed.). (1960). The Journals of the Provincial Congresses of South Carolina, 1775–1776. Columbia: South Carolina Archives Department.
- Laurens, J. (1997). The Army Correspondence of Colonel John Laurens in the Years 1777-1778. University of South Carolina Press.
- Rutledge, E. (1973). The Autobiography of Edward Rutledge, 1774-1789. University of South Carolina Press.

=== Online ===
- South Carolina Department of Archives and History, The State of South Carolina

== Related bibliographies ==
- List of bibliographies on American history
- Bibliography of American history
- Bibliography of United States military history

== See also ==
- Bibliography of John C. Calhoun
- History of South Carolina
- Territorial evolution of South Carolina
- South Carolina State Library
- South Carolina Historical Society
