= Abby Kent-Means =

Acting First Lady of the United States

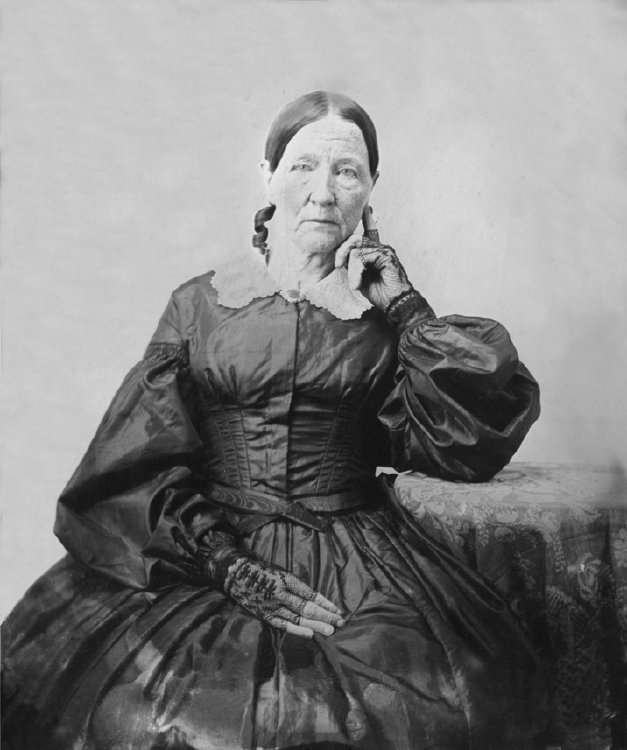
- Born: Abigail Atherton Kent; August 27, 1802; Chester, New Hampshire, United States
- Died: August 4, 1857 (aged 54)
- Known for: Acting as first lady
- Spouse(s): Robert Means, Jr. (m. 1834; died 1842)
- Parent(s): Amos Kent, Jr. Abigail Kent (née Atherton)
- Relatives: Jane Pierce (niece), Joshua Atherton (grandfather)

Abigail Atherton Kent-Means (née Kent; August 27, 1802 – August 4, 1857) was an American society hostess who acted as the White House hostess during the presidency of Franklin Pierce, as Pierce's wife Jane Pierce was not well enough to carry out official duties. Kent-Means was Jane's maternal aunt.

== Biography ==
Abigail Atherton Kent was born in Chester, New Hampshire, on August 27, 1802, to Amos Kent Jr. and Abigail Kent (née Atherton), the second of their nine children.

On October 28, 1834, Kent-Means married Robert Means Jr., the maternal uncle of Jane Pierce. Her husband was a first cousin, since his own mother, Catherine Atherton had married David MacGregor Means (1841–1931), a lawyer and former assistant editor of The Nation.

They lived in the Col. Robert Means Mansion in Amherst, New Hampshire, which was built in 1785. When her husband died in 1842, Kent-Means inherited the mansion and proceeded to make "major alterations" four years later in 1846. The alterations included wallpapering the rooms, replacing windows, adding a food passthrough, and replacing the fireplace architraves on one of the nine fireplaces.

Franklin Pierce was elected president in 1853. His wife Jane went through intense periods of mourning for losing all her children, and was not able to assist in hostess duties. During those times, the widowed Kent-Means stood in as White House hostess, along with Varina Davis, second wife of Jefferson Davis. Kent-Means lived at the White House during this time.

Kent-Means died on either August 3 or 4, 1857, aged 54, five months after Pierce's presidency ended and James Buchanan's term had begun.

== Ancestry ==
Her mother was the second daughter of Joshua Atherton, an early anti-slavery campaigner in Massachusetts and New Hampshire, who later served as Attorney General of New Hampshire.

Her great-great-great grandfather James Atherton arrived from England in the 1630s, and went on to serve under Captain John Whiting's Company, eventually becoming one of the founders of Lancaster.

Her great-great-great-grandfather on his maternal line was Samuel Wardwell, a carpenter, who was charged with witchcraft in 1692, and was hung at Witch Hill, in Andover, Massachusetts.
