= Attorney General Atherton =

Attorney General Atherton may refer to:

- William Atherton (politician) (1806–1864), Attorney General for England and Wales
- Joshua Atherton (1737–1809), Attorney General of New Hampshire
