= Jane Pierce =

First Lady of the United States from 1853 to 1857

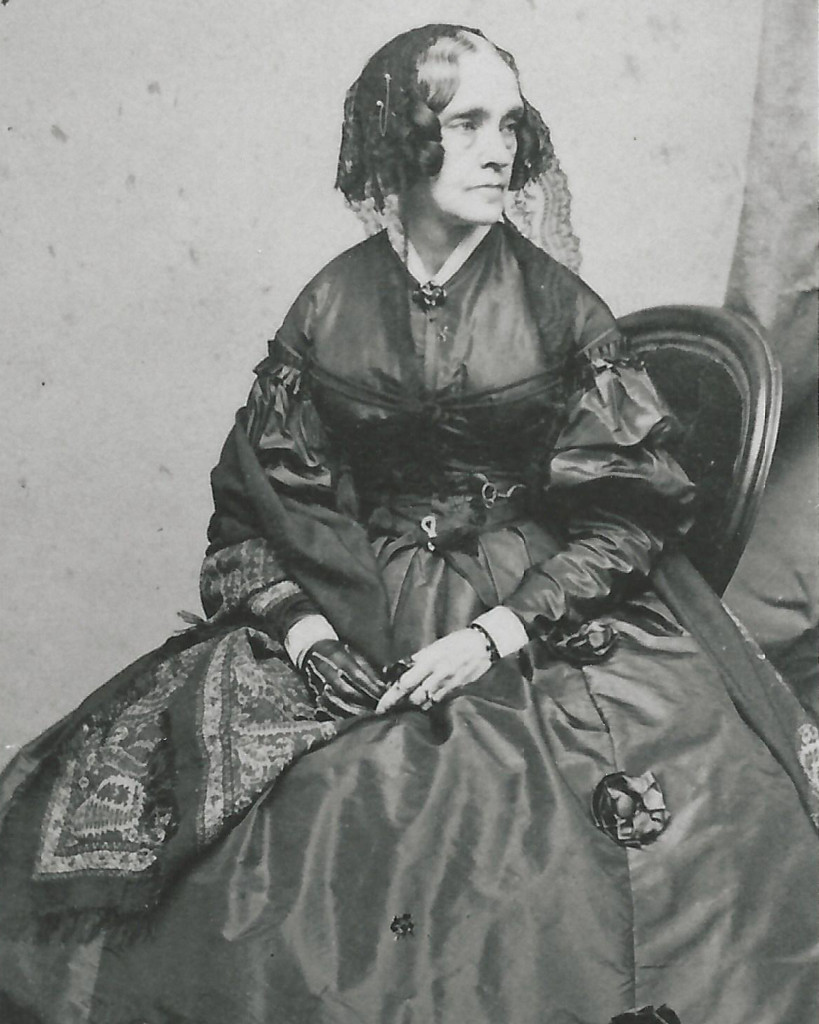
- Pierce in 1857

First Lady of the United States
- In role March 4, 1853 – March 4, 1857
- President: Franklin Pierce
- Preceded by: Abigail Fillmore
- Succeeded by: Harriet Lane (acting)

Personal details
- Born: Jane Means Appleton; March 12, 1806 Hampton, New Hampshire, U.S.
- Died: December 2, 1863 (aged 57) Andover, Massachusetts, U.S.
- Resting place: Old North Cemetery
- Spouse: Franklin Pierce (m. 1834)
- Children: 3
- Parent(s): Jesse Appleton; Elizabeth Means

Jane Means Pierce (née Appleton; March 12, 1806 – December 2, 1863) was the first lady of the United States from 1853 to 1857, being married to Franklin Pierce, the 14th president of the United States. Born in Hampton, New Hampshire, she married Pierce, then a congressman, in 1834 despite her family's misgivings. She refused to live in Washington, D.C., and in 1842, she convinced her husband to retire from politics. He sought the Democratic presidential nomination without her knowledge in 1852 and was elected president later that year. Their only surviving son, Benjamin, was killed in a train accident before Franklin's inauguration, sending Jane into a deep depression that afflicted her for the rest of her life. Pierce was a reclusive first lady, spending the first two years of her husband's presidency mourning her son. Her duties at this time were often fulfilled by Abby Kent-Means. After Franklin's presidency, they traveled abroad for two years before settling in Massachusetts. She died of tuberculosis in 1863.

Pierce disliked political life and was unhappy in the role of first lady. She took interest in abolitionism, and attempted to influence her husband's decisions on the subject. A Puritan, Pierce was strictly religious and believed the tragedies she suffered were divine retribution for her and her husband's sins. Jane has been described as the opposite of her husband, who was outgoing, political, and a heavy drinker. She was reclusive, averse to politics, and a teetotaler.

== Early life ==
Jane Means Appleton was born in Hampton, New Hampshire, on March 12, 1806, to Congregationalist minister Jesse Appleton and his wife Elizabeth Means Appleton. The Appletons had six children: three elder daughters, of which Jane was the third, and three younger sons. Their father became president of Bowdoin College in 1807, and the family settled in Brunswick, Maine (then part of Massachusetts). Her father's religious practices included a strict fasting diet that caused his health to decline, leading to his death in 1819. After his death, the family lived with Elizabeth's mother in Amherst, New Hampshire. In her childhood, Appleton acquired a devotion to Puritan, evangelical Calvinism.

Appleton came from a well-off and well-connected New England family. Jane's education was of a high quality, consisting of both public schooling and homeschooling. She attended the prestigious Miss Catherine Fiske's Young Ladies Seminary in Keene, New Hampshire, where she received an education of a higher quality than women could typically access. She was talented in music and enthusiastic about literature, but declined to pursue these further in favor of Bible study. As she approached young adulthood, Appleton was shy, devoutly religious, and pro-temperance. Even in her youth, her health was poor; she regularly contracted severe winter colds.

== Marriage and family ==
Appleton met Franklin Pierce after he moved to Amherst to study law at Bowdoin. One anecdote suggests that they met during a thunderstorm when he implored her not to sit under a tree for risk of lightning strikes. Another suggests that they were introduced by Alpheus Packard, Jane's brother-in-law and one of Franklin's professors. She may also have met him while he was visiting her mother's home. Appleton's family opposed the relationship for a number of reasons, including their difference in class, his poor manners, his drinking, his tolerance of slavery, his Episcopalian beliefs, and his political aspirations. They courted for seven years, including a period in which Franklin moved to Hillsborough, New Hampshire, to practice law and serve in the New Hampshire General Court. Franklin and Jane married in a small ceremony on November 19, 1834, by which time Franklin was a member of the House of Representatives. They were seen as opposites, Jane's reclusiveness and depression contrasting with Franklin's gregariousness and public aspirations.

The Pierces went together to Washington, D.C., after their marriage, but Jane found the city unpleasant. In 1835, she attended the White House New Year's Day reception with her husband and met President Andrew Jackson. She decided to leave the city later that year, returning to her mother's home in Amherst while her husband remained in Washington. The Pierces later purchased a home in Hillsborough where Jane chose to live while Franklin was away. They moved to Concord, New Hampshire, in 1838 while Franklin was a senator, and Jane encouraged him to resign and retire from politics in 1842. Jane abhorred politics, and her distaste for the subject created a tension that continued throughout her husband's political ascent. Though politics was often a point of debate or argument between the two, they were otherwise warm with one another and wrote each other regularly when apart.

Franklin and Jane had three sons, all of whom died in childhood. Franklin Jr. was born in 1836 and died three days after his birth. Frank Robert was born in 1839 and died in 1843 at age four of epidemic typhus. Benjamin was born in 1841 and died in 1853 at age 11 in a train accident. Following the end of her husband's term in the Senate, Pierce was able to live a domestic life with her family together at home. Franklin provided for the family with his law practice, though he briefly went away to serve as a brigadier general in the Mexican–American War. This period of Jane's life is often regarded as her happiest, as her husband was out of politics and she still had two surviving sons. Their house was sold during the war, and the family made various living arrangements over the following months. President James K. Polk offered Franklin an appointment as United States Attorney General, but he turned it down due to Jane's objection. After the death of their second son, Pierce focused on raising their only surviving son, Benjamin, in a strict religious manner while her husband operated his law practice. She wholly dedicated herself to Benjamin and avoided any obligations beyond her family and her religion. Pierce did not carry out housework due to her health, so it was carried out by a married couple that Franklin hired to care for Jane and Benjamin while he was away.

== First Lady of the United States ==
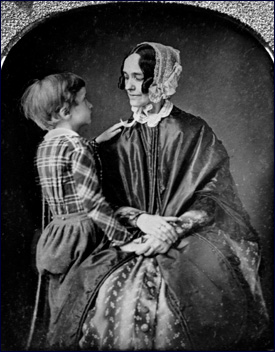
Jane Pierce with her last surviving son, Benjamin Pierce. The child died in 1853 in a train crash, two months before his father was sworn into office as president.

In 1852, Pierce's husband received the Democratic Party nomination for president. She is said to have fainted upon hearing the news. He had deceived her about his presidential aspirations, denying the extent to which he was seeking the office. He sought to persuade her that if he became president, their son Benjamin would be more likely to become successful. Despite this, she regularly prayed that her husband would lose the presidential election. Her prayers went unanswered, as he was elected by a large margin on November 2, 1852.

While Franklin was president-elect, a train with the Pierces on board derailed, and Benjamin was killed in front of his parents. Pierce went into a deeper depression after witnessing her final son's death, believing that God took their sons as a punishment for her husband's political aspirations. She did not attend his presidential inauguration, instead staying in Baltimore for two weeks. Pierce was also affected by the deaths of her predecessor Abigail Fillmore and Vice President William R. King over the following weeks.

For the first few months of her husband's term, Pierce did not take visitors and only sparingly attended public receptions, and she entertained only family and friends. Upon arriving at the White House, she wore black and had the White House decorated for mourning. She did not host social events or supervise the White House in the traditional role of first lady, leaving these responsibilities to her aunt and close friend Abby Kent-Means. She avoided company, regularly engaging in private Bible study. Pierce also developed a friendship with Varina Davis, wife of Secretary of War Jefferson Davis. She took an interest in the Davises' infant son, though he became ill and died in 1854. She gradually acclimated to life as First Lady, attending the New Year's reception two years into her husband's term and the Friday evening receptions thereafter. Pierce attempted to communicate with her late son while she was first lady, sometimes writing letters to him as an exercise in grief. She also attempted to contact him through a séance with the assistance of the Fox sisters, major figures in the Spiritualism movement.

As first lady, Pierce insisted on adherence to religious practice in the White House, instructing the staff to attend church and holding religious services in the White House library. Pierce's cousin Amos A. Lawrence described the effect this had on her husband, saying that he was deeply pious in her presence but drank heavily when she was away. She also lobbied him on occasion; in 1856, she convinced him to reverse the arrest of abolitionist Charles L. Robinson. During times of poor health, Franklin invited many of her nieces and nephews to the White House to care for her. Taking an interest in abolitionism, she began attending Congressional debates after her period of mourning to follow the issue. At the end of her husband's term, she again declined to attend the presidential inauguration, this time of her husband's successor James Buchanan.

== Later life and death ==
The Pierces lived in Washington for a month after the end of Franklin's presidential term and then toured New England during the summer. They traveled abroad for two years, returning home to purchase 60 acres (24 ha) of land in Concord before leaving for the West Indies. Pierce avoided Concord as it reminded her of her late son, and she often stayed with relatives in Massachusetts for the remainder of her life. During the American Civil War, she supported the Union and the cause of abolitionism, while her husband supported the preservation of slavery in order to preserve the nation and the Constitution. Pierce's bouts of tuberculosis worsened in the years after Franklin's presidency, and she died on December 2, 1863, at age 57. She was buried at Old North Cemetery in Concord. Franklin Pierce died on October 8, 1869, aged 64, and was interred beside his wife and son. In her will, she bequeathed money to the American Bible Society, the American Society for Foreign Missions, and the American Colonization Society.

== Public perception and legacy ==
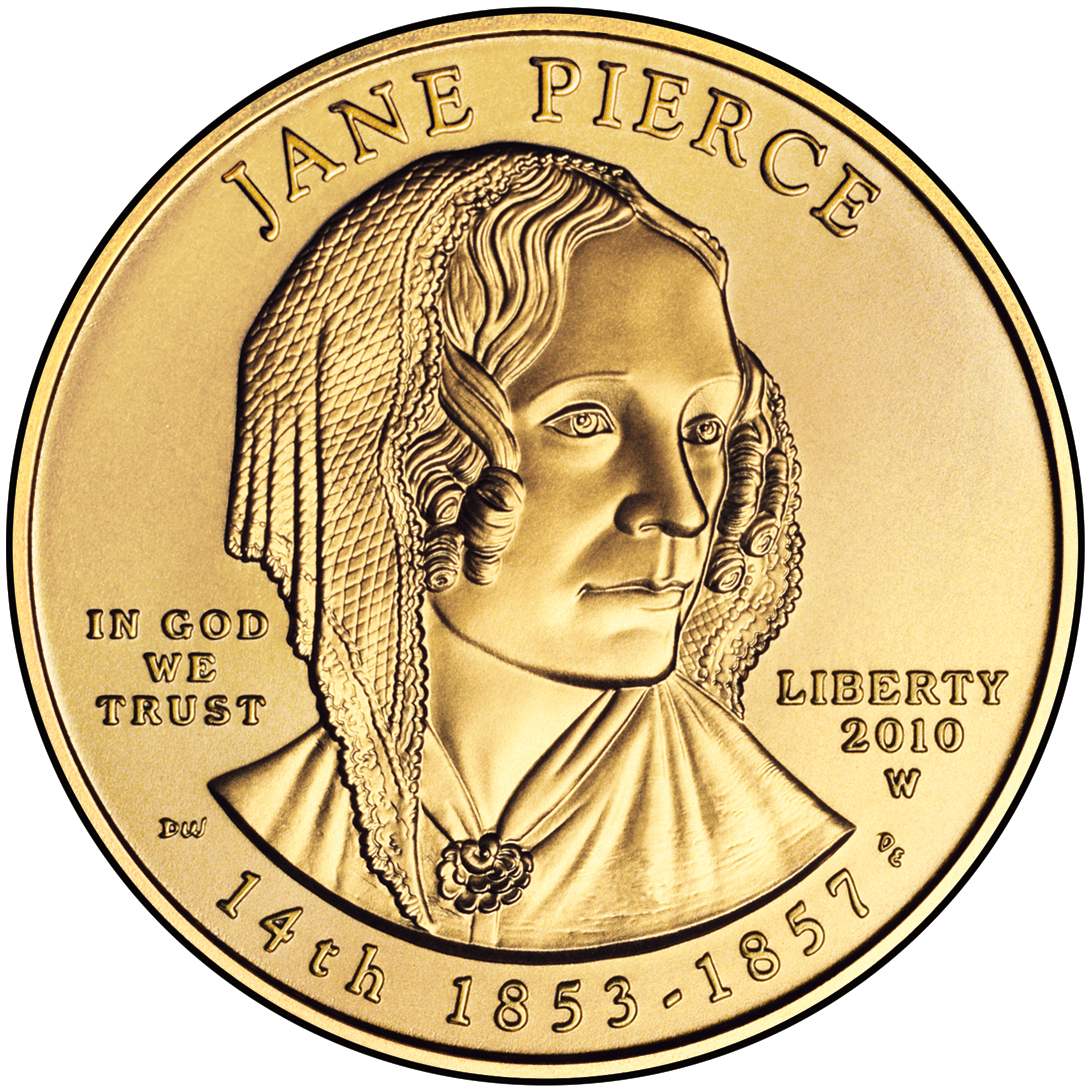
2010 commemorative First Spouse coin featuring Jane Pierce

The general public's first impression of Pierce was in a biography of her husband by family friend Nathaniel Hawthorne at the beginning of Franklin's campaign. It emphasized her poor health as her husband's reason for declining a role in the Polk administration, creating a reputation as a sickly woman that has persisted ever since. While first lady, Pierce was considered an invalid and seen as a depressing presence in a depressing White House, though she received sympathy from the people for her grief. She was known as "the shadow of the White House". She received backlash from the public after canceling Saturday evening Marine Band concerts in view of the Sabbath. Hawthorne once wrote that she "wasn't really of this world."

Pierce is ranked poorly among historians, with polling showing that she is considered one of the least effectual first ladies. She is also one of the most obscure, having served in the role before it had national prominence and during a presidency that has itself become obscure. Much like other antebellum first ladies, she has often been identified as avoiding the spotlight and of little importance to her husband's administration. She is considered to have had little influence on the position of first lady and set no precedent for her successors. Pierce's influence on her husband manifested through her dislike of politics, including her role in his decision to retire from the Senate in 1842. Some scholars have suggested that in the course of her relationship with her husband, she may have felt a religious compulsion to save his soul and courted him because of his vices rather than despite them. While contemporary perception of Pierce was generally one of sympathy, a trend among 20th-century historians was to describe her as a hypochondriac who failed to support her husband during tragedy and to consider her as a damaging factor in her husband's poorly received presidency.

== Political beliefs ==
Pierce was a Puritan, and this formed the basis of her worldview. Her religious beliefs impressed on her the conviction that suffering was punishment from God. She strongly opposed Washington's political and social culture, lamenting the regular parties and alcohol consumption. She was raised as a Whig, which caused conflict with her family when she married her husband, who served in office as a Democrat. She supported the temperance movement and opposed the consumption of alcohol. Pierce also supported abolitionism, in contrast to her husband's tolerance of slavery in the name of states' rights, and wished for a Union victory in the American Civil War. Pierce admired Andrew Jackson while he was president. She disliked Representative Davy Crockett, believing him "conceited, stupid, [and] silly".

== See also ==
- Bibliography of Franklin Pierce
- Bibliography of United States presidential spouses and first ladies

== Notes ==
Honorary titles
Preceded by Abigail Fillmore	First Lady of the United States; 1853–1857	Succeeded by Harriet Lane; Acting
