= Calhoun and Popular Rule =

2001 book

- Author: H. Lee Cheek
- Language: English
- Genre: Nonfiction
- Publisher: University of Missouri Press
- Publication date: 2001
- Publication place: United States

Calhoun and Popular Rule: The Political Theory of the Disquisition and Discourse is a book written by H. Lee Cheek, Jr. and published by the University of Missouri Press in 2001.
