= Inauguration of Franklin Pierce =

17th United States presidential inauguration

Presidential inauguration of Franklin Pierce
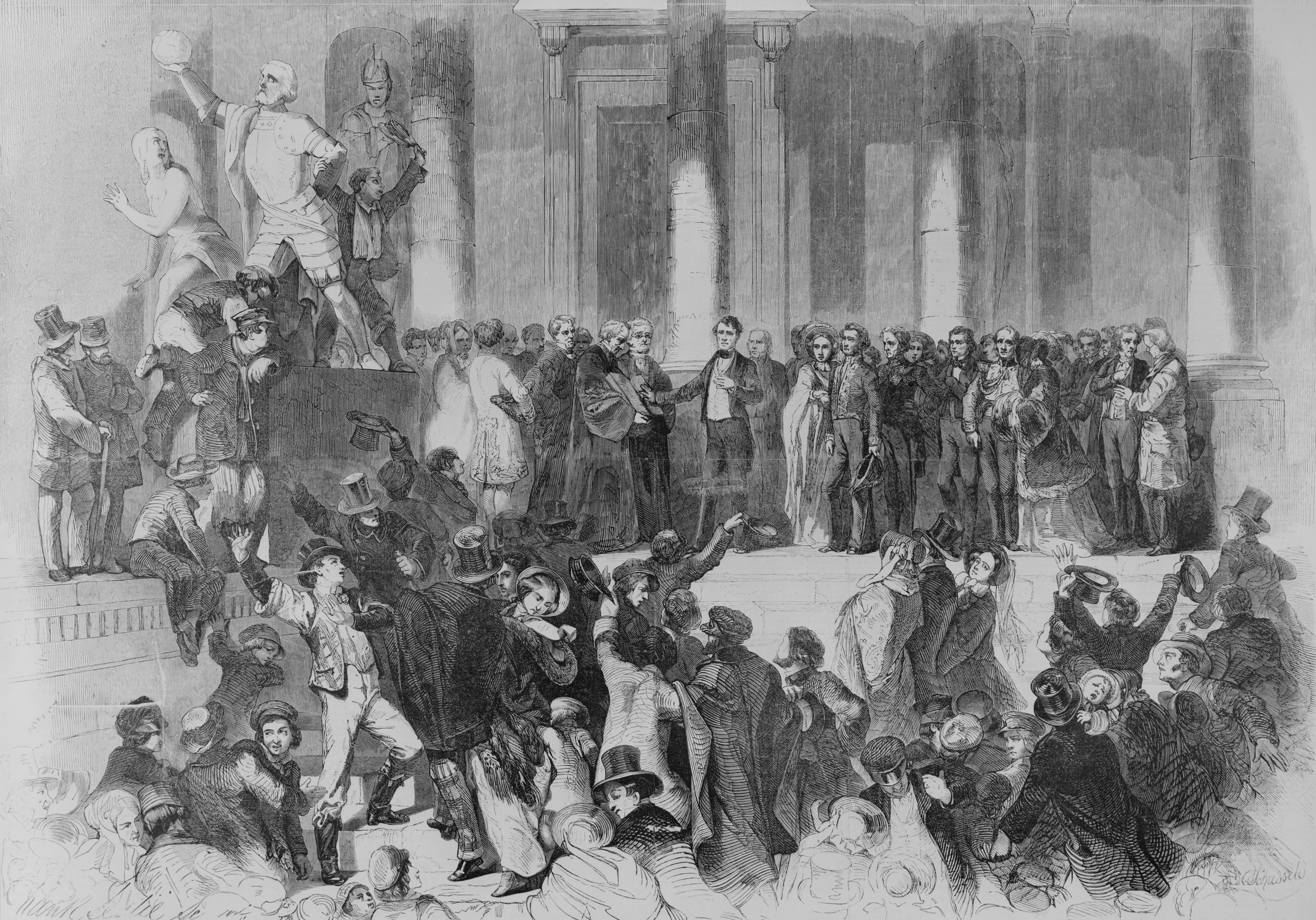
- Image of the inauguration of Franklin Pierce from The Illustrated News
- Date: March 4, 1853; 173 years ago (Pierce); March 24, 1853 (King)
- Location: United States Capitol, Washington, D.C. (Pierce) Havana, Spanish Cuba (King)
- Participants: Franklin Pierce; 14th president of the United States — Assuming office Roger B. Taney; Chief Justice of the United States — Administering oath William R. King; 13th vice president of the United States — Assuming office William L. Sharkey; United States consul in Havana, Spanish Cuba — Administering oath

The inauguration of Franklin Pierce as the 14th president of the United States was held on Friday, March 4, 1853, at the East Portico of the United States Capitol in Washington, D.C. This was the 17th inauguration and marked the commencement of the only four-year term of both Franklin Pierce as president and William R. King as vice president. Chief Justice Roger B. Taney administered the presidential oath of office. Pierce elected to affirm the oath of office rather than swear it, and was also the first president to recite his inaugural address from memory.

Pierce's address alluded to the train accident which occurred just weeks earlier and took the life of his only remaining son, he said:

It is a relief to feel that no heart but my own can know the personal regret and bitter sorrow over which I have been borne to a position so suitable for others rather than desirable for myself.

The first lady, Jane Pierce, still in mourning from the incident, missed the inauguration and did not arrive in DC until weeks later.

Gravely ill with tuberculosis, King was in Spanish Cuba in an effort to recover in the warmer climate, and was not able to be in Washington to take his oath of office on March 4. By a Special Act of Congress, he was allowed to take the oath outside the United States, and was sworn in on March 24, 1853. He is the only vice president to be sworn in while in a foreign country. King died 45 days into his term, and the office remained vacant since there was no constitutional provision which allow an intra-term vice-presidential office filling; it would be regulated by the Twenty-fifth Amendment in 1967.

== See also ==
- Presidency of Franklin Pierce
- 1852 United States presidential election
