= Bibliography of John Quincy Adams =

The following is a list of important scholarly resources related to John Quincy Adams, the sixth president of the United States.

== Secondary sources ==
- Adams, Sean Patrick (October 2008). "The Tao of John Quincy Adams: Or, new institutionalism and the early American republic". Common-place.org. 9 (1). Worcester, Massachusetts, US: American Antiquarian Society. ISSN 1544-824X. Archived from the original on August 28, 2015.
- Allgor, Catherine (1997). "'A Republican in a Monarchy': Louisa Catherine Adams in Russia". Diplomatic History. 21 (1): 15–43. doi:10.1111/1467-7709.00049. ISSN 0145-2096. Fulltext in Swetswise, Ingenta and Ebsco.
- Bemis, Samuel Flagg (1981). John Quincy Adams and the Foundations of American Foreign Policy. Greenwood Press.
- Bemis, Samuel Flagg (1956). John Quincy Adams and the Union. Knopf.
- Brinkley, Alan; Dyer, Davis (2004). The American Presidency. Boston: Houghton Mifflin. ISBN 0-618-38273-9.
- Cameron, Duncan; Dick, Andrew; Fitzmaurice, Paul; & others. (2015) An American President in Ealing: The John Quincy Adams Diaries, 1815–1817. Publisher: Little Ealing History Group. ISBN 978-0992767907
- Cooper, William J. (2017). The Lost Founding Father: John Quincy Adams and the Transformation of American Politics. Liveright Publishing. ISBN 9781631493898.
- Crofts, Daniel W. (1997). "Congressmen, Heroic and Otherwise". Reviews in American History. 25 (2): 243–47. doi:10.1353/rah.1997.0037. ISSN 0048-7511. S2CID 144527776. Fulltext in Project Muse. Adams role in antislavery petitions debate 1835–44.
- Edel, Charles N. (2014). Nation Builder: John Quincy Adams and the Grand Strategy of the Republic. Harvard Univ. Press.
- Hargreaves, Mary W.M. (1985). The Presidency of John Quincy Adams. Univ. Press of Kansas. ISBN 978-0-7006-0272-8.
- Heffron, Margery M. "'A Fine Romance': The Courtship Correspondence between Louisa Catherine Johnson and John Quincy Adams", New England Quarterly, June 2010, Vol. 83 Issue 2, pp. 200–18
- Holt, Michael F. The Rise and Fall of the American Whig Party: Jacksonian Politics and the Onset of the Civil War. 1999.
- Howe, Daniel Walker (2007). What Hath God Wrought: The Transformation of America, 1815–1848. Oxford Univ. Press. ISBN 978-0-19-507894-7.
- Isenberg, Nancy; Burstein, Andrew (2019). The Problem of Democracy: The Presidents Adams Confront the Cult of Personality. New York: Viking. ISBN 9780525557500.
- Kaplan, Fred (2014). John Quincy Adams: American Visionary. HarperCollins. Biography
- Lewis, James E. Jr. John Quincy Adams: Policymaker for the Union. Scholarly Resources, 2001. 164 pp.
- Mattie, Sean (2003). "John Quincy Adams and American Conservatism". Modern Age. 45 (4): 305–14. ISSN 0026-7457. fulltext online
- McCullough, David (2001). John Adams. New York: Simon & Schuster. p. 144. ISBN 978-1-4165-7588-7.
- McMillan, Richard (2001). "Election of 1824: Corrupt Bargain or the Birth of Modern Politics?". New England Journal of History. 58 (2): 24–37.
- Melanson, James. "'Entangling Affiances with None': John Quincy Adams, James K. Polk, and the Impact of Conflicting Interpretations", New England Journal of History, Fall 2009, Vol. 66 Issue 1, pp. 26–36, on Monroe Doctrine
- Miller, Chandra (2000). "'Title Page to a Great Tragic Volume': The Impact of the Missouri Crisis on Slavery, Race, and Republicanism in the Thought of John C. Calhoun and John Quincy Adams". Missouri Historical Review. 94 (4): 365–88. ISSN 0026-6582. Shows that both men considered splitting the country as a solution.
- Miller, William Lee (1996). Arguing About Slavery: The Great Battle in the United States Congress. New York: Vintage Books. ISBN 0-394-56922-9. Also published as Arguing About Slavery: John Quincy Adams and the Great Battle in the United States Congress.
- Morris, Walter John (1963) John Quincy Adams, Germanophile, Pennsylvania State University
- Nagel, Paul C. (1983). Descent from Glory: Four Generations of the John Adams Family. New York: Oxford Univ. Press. ISBN 978-0-19-503172-0.
- Nagel, Paul (1999). John Quincy Adams: A Public Life, a Private Life. Cambridge, Massachusetts: Harvard Univ. Press. pp. 19, 21, 26, 30, 32, 49, 51, 54, 73, 76, 272, 279, 327, 346–48, 351–53, 357, 359, 368. ISBN 978-0674479401.
- Parsons, Lynn H. (2009). The Birth of Modern Politics: Andrew Jackson, John Quincy Adams, and the Election of 1828. Oxford Univ. Press. ISBN 978-0-19-531287-4. excerpt and text search
- Parsons, Lynn H. (1998). John Quincy Adams. Rowman and LittleField.
- Parsons, Lynn Hudson (2003). "In Which the Political Becomes Personal, and Vice Versa: the Last Ten Years of John Quincy Adams and Andrew Jackson". Journal of the Early Republic. 23 (3): 421–43. doi:10.2307/3595046. ISSN 0275-1275. JSTOR 3595046.
- Portolano, Marlana (2000). "John Quincy Adams's Rhetorical Crusade for Astronomy". Isis. 91 (3): 480–503. doi:10.1086/384852. ISSN 0021-1753. PMID 11143785. S2CID 25585014. Fulltext online at Jstor and Ebsco. He tried to create a national observatory, which became the U.S. Naval Observatory.
- Pessen, Edward. "John Quincy Adams" in Henry Graff, ed. The Presidents: A Reference History (3rd ed. 2002) online
- Potkay, Adam S. (1999). "Theorizing Civic Eloquence in the Early Republic: the Road from David Hume to John Quincy Adams". Early American Literature. 34 (2): 147–70. ISSN 0012-8163. Fulltext online at Swetswise and Ebsco.
- Rathbun, Lyon (2000). "The Ciceronian Rhetoric of John Quincy Adams". Rhetorica. 18 (2): 175–215. doi:10.1525/rh.2000.18.2.175. ISSN 0734-8584. S2CID 144055057.
- Remini, Robert V. (2002). John Quincy Adams. New York: Times Books. ISBN 0-8050-6939-9.
- Thompson, Robert R. (1991). "John Quincy Adams, Apostate: From "Outrageous Federalist" to "Republican Exile," 1801- 1809". Journal of the Early Republic. 11 (2): 161–183. doi:10.2307/3123239. JSTOR 3123239.
- Traub, James (2016). John Quincy Adams: Militant Spirit. Basic Books. ISBN 9780465098798.
- Unger, Harlow Giles. John Quincy Adams (2012), biography
- Waldstreicher, David, ed. A Companion to John Adams and John Quincy Adams (2013) excerpt and text search; 600pp; 25 essays by scholars
- Wood, Gary V. (2004). Heir to the Fathers: John Quincy Adams and the Spirit of Constitutional Government. Ladham, Maryland: Lexington. ISBN 0-7391-0601-5.

== Primary sources ==
- Adams, John Quincy (1810). Lectures on Rhetoric and Oratory: Delivered to the Classes of Senior and Junior Sophisters in Harvard University. 2 v. Cambridge: Printed by Hilliard and Metcalf. ISBN 9781789873467. OCLC 456915710.
- Adams, John Quincy (1874–1877). Adams, Charles Francis (ed.). Memoirs of John Quincy Adams: Comprising Portions of His Diary from 1795 to 1848. 12 v. Philadelphia: J.B. Lippincott & Co. ISBN 9780836950212. OCLC 559230698.
- Adams, John Quincy (1903). "Life in a New England town, 1787, 1788 : diary of John Quincy Adams while a student in the office of Theophilus Parsons at Newburyport". Internet Archive. Boston: Little, Brown. OCLC 749195912.
- Adams, John Quincy (1913–1917). Ford, Worthington C (ed.). Writings of John Quincy Adams. 7 v. New York: The Macmillan Company. OCLC 564019879.
- Adams, John Quincy (1961). Butterfield, L. H.; Taylor, Robert J.; Ryerson, Richard A. (eds.). The Adams Papers. Cambridge, Mass: Belknap Press of Harvard University Press. OCLC 56354007.
- Adams, John Quincy (2017). Waldstreicher, David (ed.). The Diaries of John Quincy Adams, 1779–1821. New York: Library of America. ISBN 978-1598535211.
- Adams, John Quincy (2017). Waldstreicher, David (ed.). The Diaries of John Quincy Adams, 1821-1848. New York: Library of America. ISBN 978-1598535228.

=== Online Collections ===
- "The Adams Papers". Founders Online. United States National Archives.
- Adams, John Quincy. "John Quincy Adams Papers". The American Presidency Project. Santa Barbara, CA: University of California, Santa Barbara.
