= Old North Cemetery (Concord, New Hampshire) =

- U.S. National Register of Historic Places
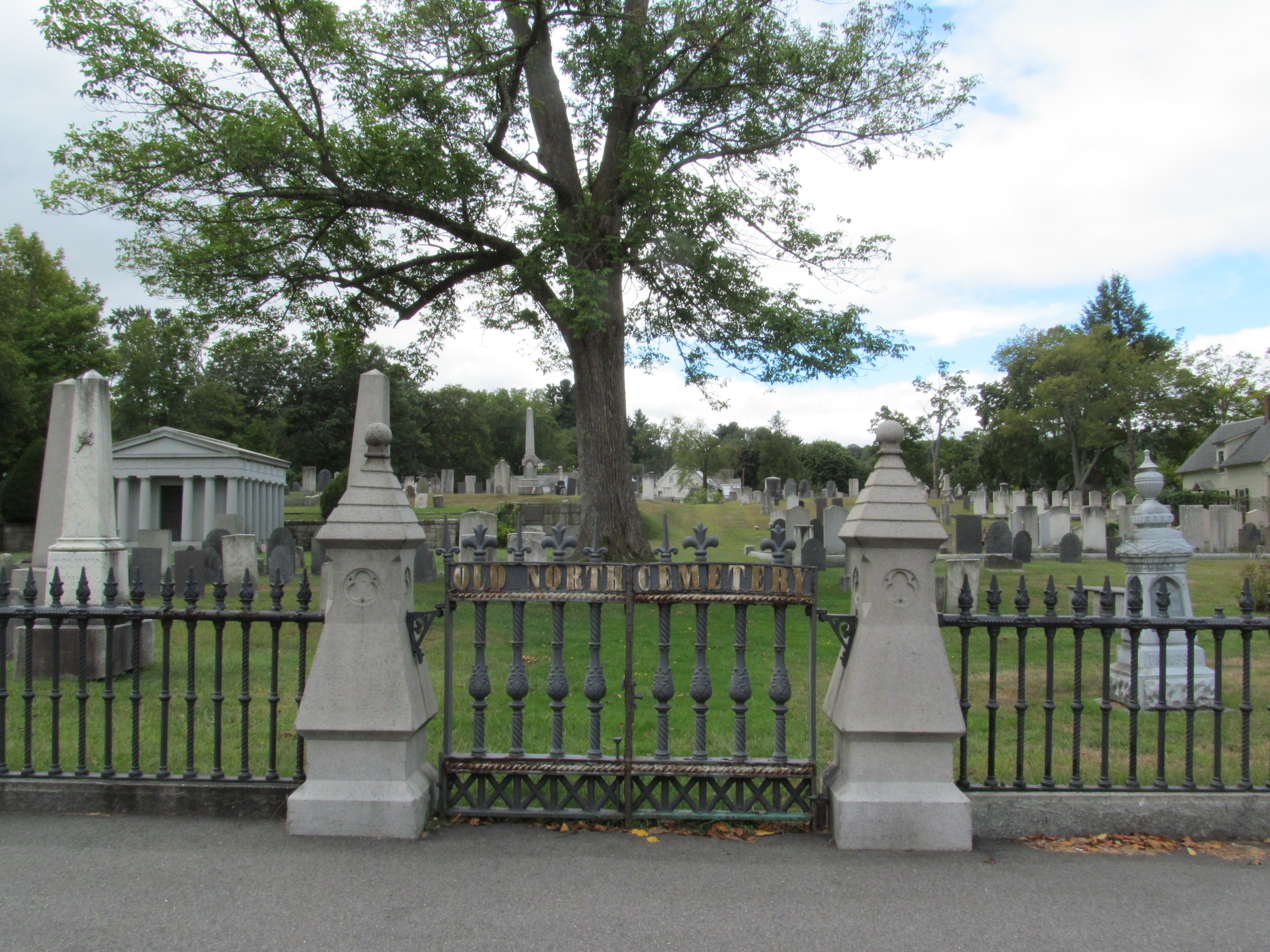

- Location within New Hampshire Location within the United States
- Location: North State St. Concord, New Hampshire
- Coordinates: 43°12′52″N 71°32′42″W
- Area: 5.85 acres (2.37 ha)
- Built: 1730
- NRHP reference No.: 08001031
- Added to NRHP: November 9, 2008

Old North Cemetery is a historic cemetery on North State Street in Concord, New Hampshire. Established in 1730, it is the city's oldest cemetery. Franklin Pierce, fourteenth president of the United States, is buried in the cemetery, as are his wife Jane and two of his three sons. It was listed on the National Register of Historic Places on November 9, 2008. The cemetery continues to accept new burials.

== Description and history ==
The Old North Cemetery is located north of modern downtown Concord, and a short way west of Concord's historic early town center. It is a roughly L-shaped property, about 6 acres (2.4 ha) in size, bounded on the east by North State Street and the west by Bradley Street. Iron fencing lines both of these street-facing boundaries, with a gate flanked by stone piers on North State Street serving as the main pedestrian access point. Vehicular access is through an entrance at the northern end of the North State Street frontage, from which a paved lane extends straight westward to a secondary gate at Bradley Street.

Grave of President Franklin Pierce

Concord was chartered in 1725, and settlement began soon afterward. The eastern portion of the cemetery was laid out in 1730, and its oldest dated burial occurred in 1736. Significant enlargements took place with the Minot Enclosure (1860), and the combining with an adjacent Quaker cemetery in the early 20th century. The single most notable burial is that of President Franklin Pierce; other notable burials include Governors David L. Morril and Matthew Harvey, as well as Lewis Downing, founder of the Abbot-Downing Company and creator of the Concord coach.

== See also ==
- List of burial places of presidents and vice presidents of the United States
- National Register of Historic Places listings in Merrimack County, New Hampshire
