= Bibliography of John C. Calhoun =

John C. Calhoun
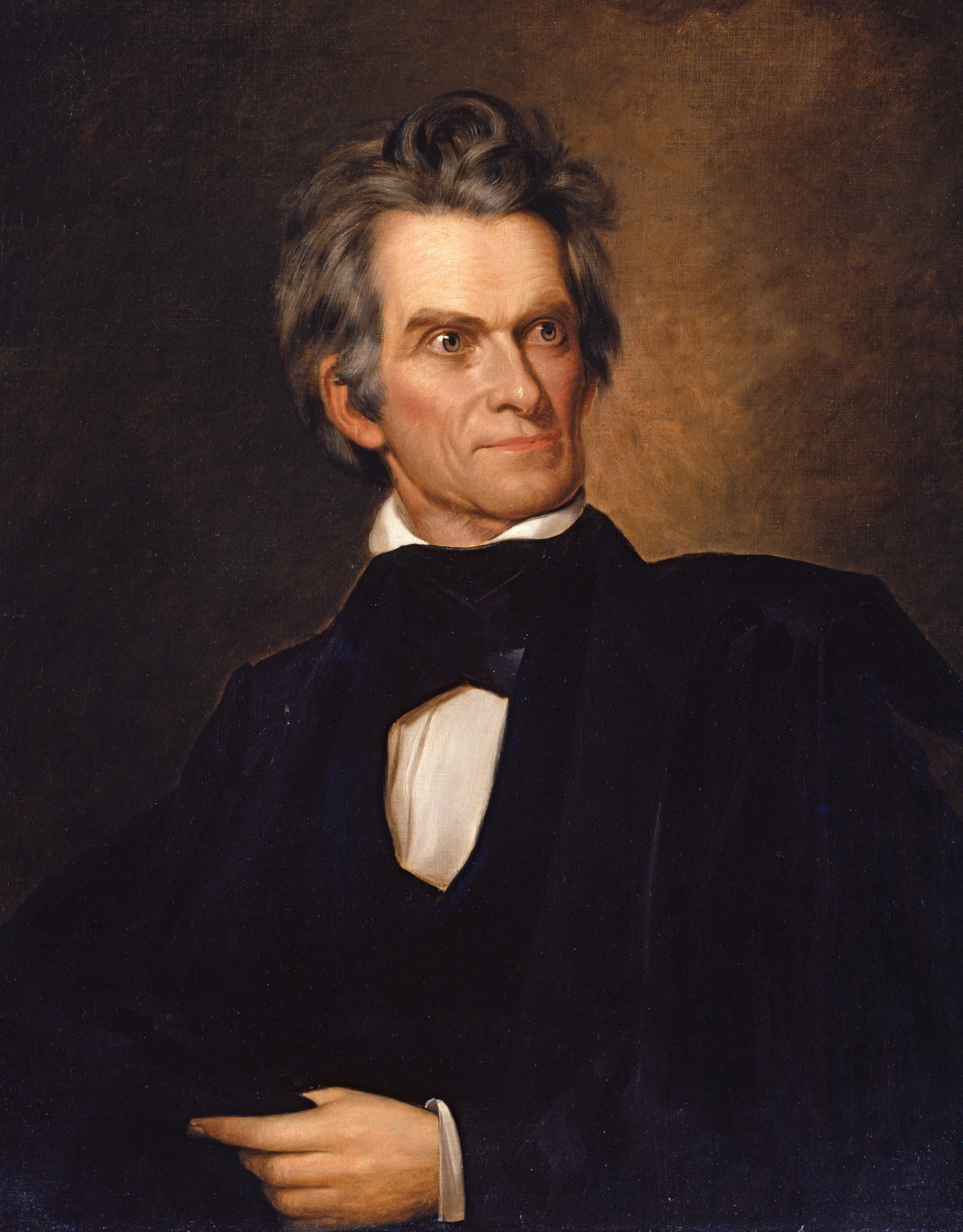
- Portrait of Calhoun, c. 1845

7th Vice President of the United States
- In office March 4, 1825 – December 28, 1832
- President: John Quincy Adams (1825–1829); Andrew Jackson (1829–1832)
- Preceded by: Daniel D. Tompkins
- Succeeded by: Martin Van Buren

United States Senator from South Carolina
- In office November 26, 1845 – March 31, 1850
- Preceded by: Daniel Elliott Huger
- Succeeded by: Franklin H. Elmore

United States Senator from South Carolina
- In office December 29, 1832 – March 3, 1843
- Preceded by: Robert Y. Hayne
- Succeeded by: Daniel Elliott Huger

16th United States Secretary of State
- In office April 1, 1844 – March 10, 1845
- President: John Tyler; James K. Polk
- Preceded by: Abel P. Upshur
- Succeeded by: James Buchanan

10th United States Secretary of War
- In office December 8, 1817 – March 4, 1825
- President: James Monroe
- Preceded by: William H. Crawford
- Succeeded by: James Barbour

Member of the U.S. House of Representatives from South Carolina's 6th district
- In office March 4, 1811 – November 3, 1817
- Preceded by: Joseph Calhoun
- Succeeded by: Eldred Simkins

Personal details
- Born: John Caldwell Calhoun; March 18, 1782 Abbeville, South Carolina, U.S.
- Died: March 31, 1850 (aged 68) Washington, D.C., U.S.
- Resting place: St. Philip's Church
- Party: Democratic-Republican (before 1828); Democratic (1828, 1839–1850); Nullifier (1828–1839)
- Spouse: Floride Bonneau Calhoun (m. 1811)
- Children: 10, including Anna
- Parent: Patrick Calhoun (father)
- Education: Yale College; Litchfield Law School

This is a select bibliography of mainly post World War II books and journal articles about John C. Calhoun (March 18, 1782 – March 31, 1850).

John Caldwell Calhoun (/kælˈhuːn/; March 18, 1782 – March 31, 1850) was an American statesman, champion of slavery, and political theorist who served as the seventh vice president of the United States from 1825 to 1832. Calhoun began his political career as a nationalist, modernizer and proponent of a strong federal government and protective tariffs. In the late 1820s, his views shifted, and he became a leading proponent of states' rights, limited government, nullification, and opposition to high tariffs, and became notorious as an outspoken defender of slavery in the United States. Calhoun saw Northern acceptance of those policies as a condition of the South remaining in the Union. His beliefs heavily influenced the South's secession from the Union in 1860 and 1861. (Note: Calhoun was the first of two vice presidents to resign from the position of Vice President, the second being Spiro Agnew, who resigned in 1973.)

Works listed here are cited in the notes or bibliographies of scholarly sources. Each is published by an academic or major press, written by a recognized expert, or substantially reviewed in scholarly journals; borderline cases are omitted. A selection of primary sources are included. Many of the books below carry their own bibliographies; see the Further reading section for other bibliographies, and the External links section for historical sites, academic sites, and museums.

Citations follow APA style. (Note: Entries are in plain text APA 7 format without templates; templates are used only for reviews and notes.) Book have citations to academic journal or mainstream published reviews when available. For books only partly about the subject, relevant chapter or section titles are provided when useful and available. Translators of the original-language edition are included when possible. In cases where a title or name has appeared with more than one English spelling, the most recent published form is used and a footnote documents any earlier title under which the work appeared.

== Bibliography ==
=== Biography ===
- Bancroft, F. (1928). Calhoun and the South Carolina nullification movement. Johns Hopkins Press.
- Barnwell, J. (1982). Love of order: South Carolina's first secession crisis. University of North Carolina Press.
- Bartlett, I. H. (1993). John C. Calhoun: A biography. W. W. Norton.
- Baskin, D. (1969). The pluralist vision of John C. Calhoun. Polity, 2(1), 49–65. JSTOR 3234088
- Belko, W. S. (2004). John C. Calhoun and the creation of the Bureau of Indian Affairs: An essay on political rivalry, ideology, and policymaking in the Early Republic. South Carolina Historical Magazine, 105(3), 170–197. JSTOR 27570693
- Brown, G. S. (2000). Calhoun's philosophy of politics: A study of A disquisition on government. Mercer University Press.
- Capers, G. M. (1948). A reconsideration of John C. Calhoun's transition from nationalism to nullification. The Journal of Southern History, 14(1), 34. JSTOR 2197709
- Capers, G. M. (1960). John C. Calhoun, opportunist: A reappraisal. University of Florida Press.
- Cheek, H. L., Jr. (2001). Calhoun and popular rule: The political theory of the Disquisition and Discourse. University of Missouri Press.
- Coit, M. L. (1950). John C. Calhoun: American portrait. Houghton Mifflin.
- Coit, M. L. (Ed.). (1970). John C. Calhoun: Great lives observed. Prentice-Hall.
- Current, R. N. (1966). John C. Calhoun. Washington Square Press.
- Drucker, P. F. (1948). A key to American politics: Calhoun's pluralism. The Review of Politics, 10(4), 412–426. doi:10.1017/s0034670500047550
- Elder, R. (2021). Calhoun: American heretic. Basic Books.
- Ellis, R. E. (1987). The Union at risk: Jacksonian democracy, states' rights, and the nullification crisis. Oxford University Press.
- Ericson, D. F. (1995). The nullification crisis, American republicanism, and the Force Bill debate. The Journal of Southern History, 61(2), 249. JSTOR 2211577
- Fitzgerald, M. S. (1996). Rejecting Calhoun's expansible army plan: The Army Reduction Act of 1821. War in History, 3(2), 161–185. doi:10.1177/096834459600300202
- Ford, L. K., Jr. (1988a). Origins of Southern radicalism: The South Carolina upcountry, 1800–1860. Oxford University Press.
- Ford, L. K., Jr. (1988b). Recovering the republic: Calhoun, South Carolina, and the concurrent majority. South Carolina Historical Magazine, 89(3), 146–159. JSTOR 27568041
- Ford, L. K., Jr. (1988c). Republican ideology in a slave society: The political economy of John C. Calhoun. The Journal of Southern History, 54(3), 405. JSTOR 2208996
- Ford, L. K., Jr. (1994). Inventing the concurrent majority: Madison, Calhoun, and the problem of majoritarianism in American political thought. The Journal of Southern History, 60(1), 19. JSTOR 2210719
- Freehling, W. W. (1965). Spoilsmen and interests in the thought and career of John C. Calhoun. The Journal of American History, 52(1), 25. JSTOR 1901122
- Freehling, W. W. (1966). Prelude to Civil War: The nullification controversy in South Carolina, 1816–1836. Harper & Row.
- Garson, R. A. (1985). Proslavery as political theory: The examples of John C. Calhoun and George Fitzhugh. South Atlantic Quarterly, 84(2), 197–212. doi:10.1215/00382876-84-2-197
- Greenberg, K. S. (1976). Revolutionary ideology and the proslavery argument: The abolition of slavery in antebellum South Carolina. The Journal of Southern History, 42(3), 365. JSTOR 2207157
- Grove, J. (2015). Calhoun and conservative reform. American Political Thought, 4(2), 203–227. doi:10.1086/680389
- Grove, J. G. (2014). Binding the republic together: The early political thought of John C. Calhoun. South Carolina Historical Magazine, 115(2), 100–121. JSTOR 24332785
- Gutzman, K. R. C. (2002). Paul to Jeremiah: Calhoun's abandonment of nationalism. Journal of Libertarian Studies, 16(2), 3–33.
- Heckscher, G. (1939). Calhoun's idea of "concurrent majority" and the constitutional theory of Hegel. American Political Science Review, 33(4), 585–590. JSTOR 1949492
- Hofstadter, R. (1948). John C. Calhoun: The Marx of the master class. In The American political tradition and the men who made it. Alfred A. Knopf.
- Jarvis, D. E. (2013). The Southern conservative thought of John C. Calhoun and the cultural foundations of the Canadian identity. American Review of Canadian Studies, 43(3), 297–314. doi:10.1080/02722011.2013.819584
- Kateb, G. (1969). The majority principle: Calhoun and his antecedents. Political Science Quarterly, 84(4), 583–605. JSTOR 2147126
- Lerner, R. (1963). Calhoun's new science of politics. American Political Science Review, 57(4), 918–932. JSTOR 1952609
- Meigs, W. M. (1917). The life of John Caldwell Calhoun (2 vols.). Neale Publishing.
- Merriam, C. E. (1902). The political theory of Calhoun. American Journal of Sociology, 7(5), 577–594. doi:10.1086/211084
- Niven, J. (1988). John C. Calhoun and the price of union: A biography. Louisiana State University Press.
- Park, B. E. (2017). The angel of nullification: Imagining disunion in an era before secession. Journal of the Early Republic, 37(3), 507–536. doi:10.1353/jer.2017.0048
- Peterson, M. D. (1987). The great triumvirate: Webster, Clay, and Calhoun. Oxford University Press.
- Rayback, J. G. (1948). The presidential ambitions of John C. Calhoun, 1844–1848. The Journal of Southern History, 14(3), 331. JSTOR 2197879
- Read, J. H. (2009). Majority rule versus consensus: The political thought of John C. Calhoun. University Press of Kansas.
- Safford, J. L. (1995). John C. Calhoun, Lani Guinier, and minority rights. PS: Political Science & Politics, 28(2), 211–216. JSTOR 420348
- Salter, A. W. (2014). Calhoun's concurrent majority as a generality norm. Constitutional Political Economy, 26(3), 375–390. doi:10.1007/s10602-014-9183-x
- Sinha, M. (2000). The counterrevolution of slavery: Politics and ideology in antebellum South Carolina. University of North Carolina Press.
- Spain, A. O. (1951). The political theory of John C. Calhoun. Bookman Associates.
- Vajda, Z. (2001). John C. Calhoun's republicanism revisited. Rhetoric & Public Affairs, 4(3), 433–457. doi:10.1353/rap.2001.0056
- Vajda, Z. (2013). Complicated sympathies: John C. Calhoun's sentimental Union and the South. South Carolina Historical Magazine, 114(3), 210–230. JSTOR 23645453
- Vile, J. R. (1989). John C. Calhoun and the constitutional amending process: Article V and the theory of concurrent majorities. American Review of Politics, 9, 64–76. doi:10.15763/issn.2374-7781.1988.9.0.64-76
- von Holst, H. (1882). John C. Calhoun. Houghton Mifflin.
- Wilson, C. N. (1990). John C. Calhoun: A bibliography. Meckler.
- Wiltse, C. M. (1941). Calhoun's democracy. The Journal of Politics, 3(2), 210–223. JSTOR 2125432
- Wiltse, C. M. (1944). John C. Calhoun, nationalist, 1782–1828. Bobbs-Merrill.
- Wiltse, C. M. (1949). John C. Calhoun, nullifier, 1829–1839. Bobbs-Merrill.
- Wiltse, C. M. (1951). John C. Calhoun, sectionalist, 1840–1850. Bobbs-Merrill.
- Wood, W. K. (2009). History and recovery of the past: John C. Calhoun and the origins of nullification in South Carolina, 1819–1828. Southern Studies, 16, 46–68.

=== Primary sources ===
- Boucher, C. S., & Brooks, R. P. (Eds.). (1930). Correspondence addressed to John C. Calhoun, 1837–1849. In Annual report of the American Historical Association for the year 1929 (Sixteenth report of the Historical Manuscripts Commission). Government Printing Office.
- Calhoun, J. C. (1837a). Slavery a positive good [Speech]. United States Senate.
- Calhoun, J. C. (1837b). Speeches of Mr. Calhoun of S. Carolina, on the bill for the admission of Michigan: Delivered in the Senate of the United States, January, 1837.
- Calhoun, J. C. (1870). The works of John C. Calhoun: Reports and public letters (R. K. Crallé, Ed.). D. Appleton.
- Calhoun, J. C. (1953). A disquisition on government and selections from the Discourse (C. G. Post, Ed.). Liberal Arts Press.
- Calhoun, J. C. (1992a). The essential Calhoun: Selections from writings, speeches, and letters (C. N. Wilson, Ed.). Transaction Publishers.
- Calhoun, J. C. (1992b). Union and liberty: The political philosophy of John C. Calhoun (R. M. Lence, Ed.). Liberty Fund.
- Calhoun, J. C. (1995). A disquisition on government and selections from the Discourse (C. G. Post, Ed.). Hackett Publishing.
- Calhoun, J. C. (1999). The papers of John C. Calhoun (C. N. Wilson & S. B. Cook, Eds.; Vol. 25). University of South Carolina Press.
- Calhoun, J. C. (2003a). John C. Calhoun: Selected writings and speeches (H. L. Cheek, Jr., Ed.). Regnery Publishing.
- Calhoun, J. C. (2003b). The papers of John C. Calhoun (C. N. Wilson & S. B. Cook, Eds.; Vol. 27). University of South Carolina Press.
- Crallé, R. K. (Ed.). (1851–1856). The works of John C. Calhoun (6 vols.). D. Appleton.
- Freehling, W. W. (Ed.). (1967). The nullification era: A documentary record. Harper & Row.
- Hay, T. R. (1934). John C. Calhoun and the presidential campaign of 1824: Some unpublished Calhoun letters. The American Historical Review, 40(1), 82–96. doi:10.1086/ahr/40.1.82
- Jameson, J. F. (Ed.). (1900). Correspondence of John C. Calhoun. In Annual report of the American Historical Association for the year 1899 (Vol. 2). Government Printing Office.
- Meriwether, R. L., Hemphill, W. E., Wilson, C. N., Cook, S. B., & Moore, A. (Eds.). (1959–2003). The papers of John C. Calhoun (28 vols.). University of South Carolina Press.

=== Background and context ===
- Baxter, M. G. (1984). One and inseparable: Daniel Webster and the Union. Belknap Press of Harvard University Press.
- Cooper, W. J., Jr. (1978). The South and the politics of slavery, 1828–1856. Louisiana State University Press.
- Dangerfield, G. (1965). The awakening of American nationalism, 1815–1828. Harper & Row.
- Faust, D. G. (Ed.). (1981). The ideology of slavery: Proslavery thought in the antebellum South, 1830–1860. Louisiana State University Press.
- Fehrenbacher, D. E., & McAfee, W. M. (2002). The slaveholding republic: An account of the United States government's relations to slavery. Oxford University Press.
- Feller, D. (1995). The Jacksonian promise: America, 1815–1840. Johns Hopkins University Press.
- Forbes, R. P. (2007). The Missouri Compromise and its aftermath: Slavery and the meaning of America. University of North Carolina Press.
- Ford, L. K., Jr. (2009). Deliver us from evil: The slavery question in the Old South. Oxford University Press.
- Freehling, W. W. (1990). The road to disunion: Vol. 1. Secessionists at bay, 1776–1854. Oxford University Press.
- Genovese, E. D. (1992). The slaveholders' dilemma: Freedom and progress in Southern conservative thought, 1820–1860. University of South Carolina Press.
- Hamilton, H. (1964). Prologue to conflict: The crisis and compromise of 1850. University of Kentucky Press.
- Hickey, D. R. (1989). The War of 1812: A forgotten conflict. University of Illinois Press.
- Hietala, T. R. (1985). Manifest design: Anxious aggrandizement in late Jacksonian America. Cornell University Press.
- Holt, M. F. (1999). The rise and fall of the American Whig Party: Jacksonian politics and the onset of the Civil War. Oxford University Press.
- Howe, D. W. (2007). What hath God wrought: The transformation of America, 1815–1848. Oxford University Press.
- Larson, J. L. (2001). Internal improvement: National public works and the promise of popular government in the early United States. University of North Carolina Press.
- McCurry, S. (1995). Masters of small worlds: Yeoman households, gender relations, and the political culture of the antebellum South Carolina low country. Oxford University Press.
- Peterson, M. D. (1982). Olive branch and sword: The Compromise of 1833. Louisiana State University Press.
- Remini, R. V. (1988). The life of Andrew Jackson. Harper & Row.
- Remini, R. V. (1991). Henry Clay: Statesman for the Union. W. W. Norton.
- Richards, L. L. (2000). The slave power: The free North and Southern domination, 1780–1860. Louisiana State University Press.
- Satz, R. N. (1975). American Indian policy in the Jacksonian era. University of Nebraska Press.
- Sellers, C. (1991). The market revolution: Jacksonian America, 1815–1846. Oxford University Press.
- Sydnor, C. S. (1948). The development of Southern sectionalism, 1819–1848. Louisiana State University Press.
- Tise, L. E. (1987). Proslavery: A history of the defense of slavery in America, 1701–1840. University of Georgia Press.
- Varon, E. R. (2008). Disunion! The coming of the American Civil War, 1789–1859. University of North Carolina Press.
- Watson, H. L. (1990). Liberty and power: The politics of Jacksonian America. Hill and Wang.
- Wilentz, S. (2005). The rise of American democracy: Jefferson to Lincoln. W. W. Norton.

== Official and historic-site links ==
- John C. Calhoun: A Resource Guide (Library of Congress)
- The Papers of John C. Calhoun (National Archives, NHPRC project catalog)
- Clemson University: Fort Hill, National Historic Landmark and Calhoun home
- U.S. Senate: Vice President of the United States, historical overview

== See also ==
- Bibliography of Andrew Jackson
- Bibliography of John Tyler
- Bibliography of John Quincy Adams
- Bibliography of Martin Van Buren
- Jacksonian democracy
- Second Party System
