= Bibliography of Franklin Pierce =

Franklin Pierce
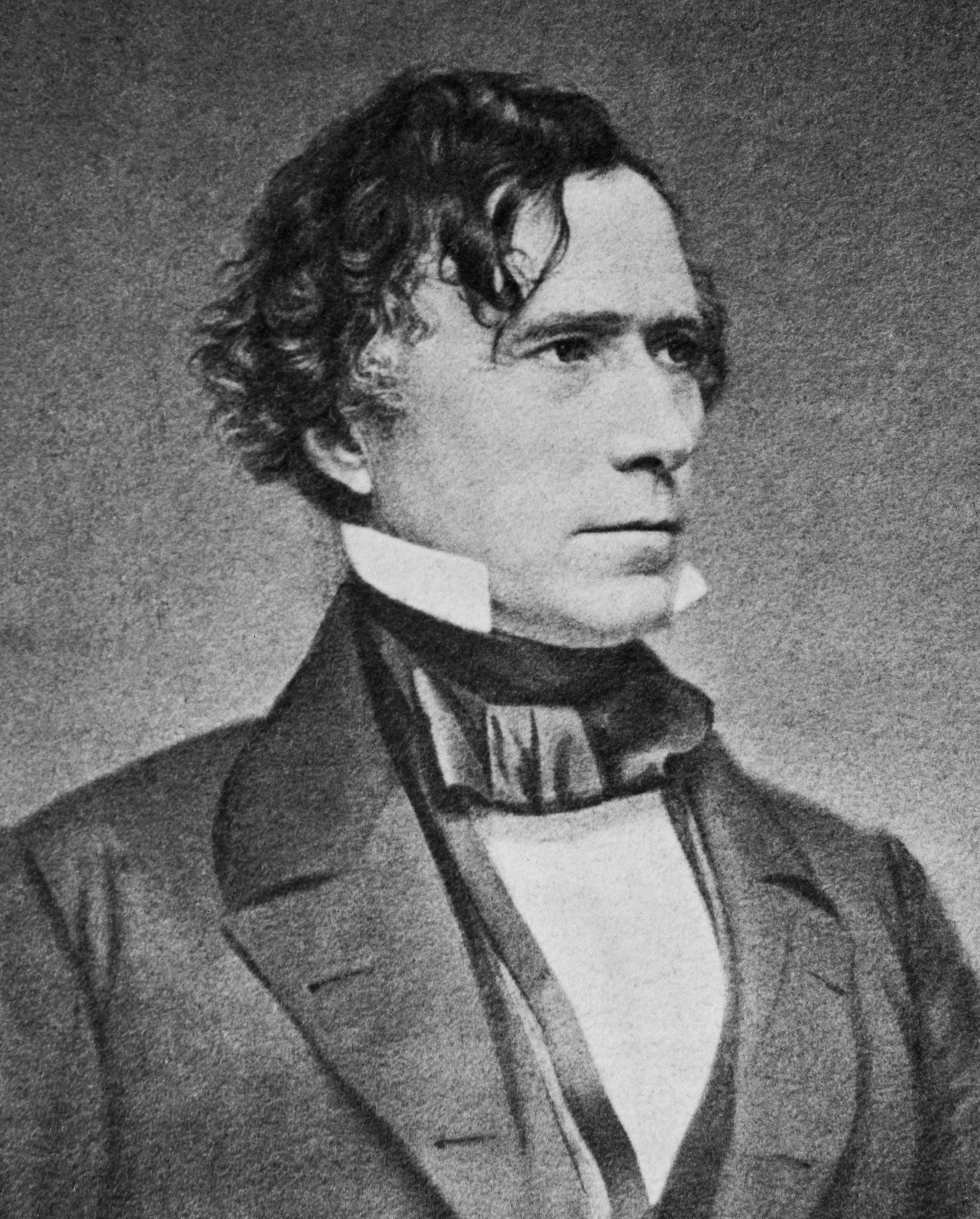
- Portrait c. 1855–65

14th President of the United States
- In office March 4, 1853 – March 4, 1857
- Vice President: William R. King (Mar–Apr 1853); Vacant (1853–1857) (Note: Vice President King died in office. As this was prior to the adoption of the Twenty-fifth Amendment in 1967, the vacancy was not filled until the next election.)
- Preceded by: Millard Fillmore
- Succeeded by: James Buchanan

United States Senator from New Hampshire
- In office March 4, 1837 – February 28, 1842
- Preceded by: John Page
- Succeeded by: Leonard Wilcox

Member of the U.S. House of Representatives from New Hampshire's at-large district
- In office March 4, 1833 – March 3, 1837
- Preceded by: Joseph Hammons
- Succeeded by: Jared W. Williams

Speaker of the New Hampshire House of Representatives
- In office January 5, 1831 – January 2, 1833
- Preceded by: Samuel C. Webster
- Succeeded by: Charles G. Atherton

Member of the New Hampshire House of Representatives from Hillsborough
- In office January 7, 1829 – January 2, 1833
- Preceded by: Thomas Wilson
- Succeeded by: Hiram Monroe

Personal details
- Born: November 23, 1804 Hillsborough, New Hampshire, U.S.
- Died: October 8, 1869 (aged 64) Concord, New Hampshire, U.S.
- Party: Democratic
- Spouse: Jane Appleton (m. 1834; died 1863)
- Children: 3
- Parent: Benjamin Pierce (father)
- Relatives: Benjamin Kendrick Pierce (brother)
- Education: Bowdoin College (BA); Northampton Law School

Military service
- Branch/service: New Hampshire Militia; United States Army
- Years of service: 1831–1847 (Militia); 1847–1848 (Army)
- Rank: Colonel (Militia); Brigadier general (Army)
- Battles/wars: Mexican–American War; Battle of Contreras; Battle of Churubusco; Battle of Molino del Rey; Battle of Chapultepec; Battle for Mexico City

This is a select bibliography of academic level books and journal articles, published mainly after World War II, (Note: Works published during or before World War II should be limited to areas where there are no significant post-World War II books on the subject or when the work in question has significant historical merit.) about the history of Franklin Pierce and his historical context.

Franklin Pierce (November 23, 1804 – October 8, 1869) was the 14th president of the United States, serving from 1853 to 1857. A northern Democrat who believed that the abolitionist movement was a fundamental threat to national unity, he alienated anti-slavery groups by signing the Kansas–Nebraska Act and enforcing the Fugitive Slave Act. Conflict between North and South continued after Pierce's presidency, and, following Abraham Lincoln's victory in the 1860 presidential election, the Southern states seceded, resulting in the American Civil War.

Works listed here are cited in the notes or bibliographies of scholarly sources. Each is published by an academic or major press, written by a recognized expert, or substantially reviewed in scholarly journals; borderline cases are omitted. A selection of primary sources are included. Many of the books below carry their own bibliographies; see the Further reading section for other bibliographies, and the External links section for historical sites, academic sites, and museums.

Citations follow APA style. (Note: Entries are in plain text APA 7 format without templates; templates are used only for reviews and notes.) Book have citations to academic journal or mainstream published reviews when available. For books only partly about the subject, relevant chapter or section titles are provided when useful and available. Translators of the original-language edition are included when possible. In cases where a title or name has appeared with more than one English spelling, the most recent published form is used and a footnote documents any earlier title under which the work appeared.

== General works ==
- Eyal, Y. (2014). Franklin Pierce, Democratic partisan. In J. H. Silbey (Ed.), A companion to the antebellum presidents 1837–1861 (pp. 345–366). Wiley Blackwell.
- Finkelman, P. (2016). Franklin Pierce. In K. Gormley (Ed.), The presidents and the Constitution: A living history (pp. 181–193). New York University Press.
- Gara, L. (1991). The presidency of Franklin Pierce. University Press of Kansas.
- Greenstein, F. I., & Anderson, D. (2013). Franklin Pierce and the Kansas-Nebraska Act. In Presidents and the dissolution of the Union: Leadership style from Polk to Lincoln. Princeton University Press.
- Holt, M. F. (2010). Franklin Pierce. Times Books.
- Nichols, R. F. (1931). Franklin Pierce: Young Hickory of the Granite Hills. University of Pennsylvania Press.
- Wallner, P. A. (2004). Franklin Pierce: New Hampshire's favorite son. Plaidswede Publishing.
- Wallner, P. A. (2007). Franklin Pierce: Martyr for the Union. Plaidswede Publishing.

== Background and context ==
The below items contain significant information about Franklin Pierce or significant background and context for his life and presidency.

- Brown, R. F. (1991). Charles Lennox Wyke and the Clayton-Bulwer formula in Central America, 1852–1860. The Americas, 47(4), 411–445.
- Eyal, Y. (2007). The Young America movement and the transformation of the Democratic Party, 1828–1861. Cambridge University Press.
- Gienapp, W. E. (1979). The crime against Sumner: The caning of Charles Sumner and the rise of the Republican party. Civil War History, 25(3), 218–245.
- Greenberg, A. S. (2005). Manifest manhood and the antebellum American empire. Cambridge University Press.
- Harlow, R. V. (1935). The rise and fall of the Kansas aid movement. The American Historical Review, 41(1), 1–25.
- Haynes, G. H. (1897). The causes of Know-Nothing success in Massachusetts. The American Historical Review, 3(1), 67–82.
- Holt, M. F. (1978). The political crisis of the 1850s. John Wiley.
- Holt, M. F. (1999). The rise and fall of the American Whig Party: Jacksonian politics and the onset of the Civil War. Oxford University Press.
- Huston, J. L. (1997). Democracy by scripture versus democracy by process: A reflection on Stephen A. Douglas and popular sovereignty. Civil War History, 43(3), 189–200.
- Johannsen, R. W. (1959). Stephen A. Douglas, "Harper's Magazine," and popular sovereignty. The Mississippi Valley Historical Review, 45(4), 606–631.
- Johannsen, R. W. (1973). Stephen A. Douglas. Oxford University Press.
- Johnson, S. A. (1930). The genesis of the New England Emigrant Aid Company. The New England Quarterly, 3(1), 95–122.
- Keith, J. A. (2011). Civilization, race, and the Japan expedition's cultural diplomacy, 1853-1854. Diplomatic History, 35(2), 179–202.
- Landis, M. T. (2014). Northern men with southern loyalties: The Democratic Party and the sectional crisis. Cornell University Press.
- Levine, B. (2001). Conservatism, nativism, and slavery: Thomas R. Whitney and the origins of the Know-Nothing party. The Journal of American History, 88(2), 455–488.
- May, R. E. (1973). The southern dream of a Caribbean empire, 1854–1861. Louisiana State University Press.
- Nichols, R. F. (1948). The disruption of American democracy. Macmillan.
- Potter, D. M. (1976). The impending crisis, 1848–1861 (D. E. Fehrenbacher, Ed.). Harper & Row.
- Rippy, J. F. (1921). The boundary of New Mexico and the Gadsden Treaty. The Hispanic American Historical Review, 4(4), 715–742.
- Ritter, L. (2020). Inventing America's first immigration crisis: Political nativism in the antebellum West. Fordham University Press.
- Silbey, J. H. (1991). The American political nation, 1838–1893. Stanford University Press.
- Urban, C. S. (1957). The Africanization of Cuba scare, 1853-1855. The Hispanic American Historical Review, 37(1), 29–45.
- Webster, S. (1893). Mr. Marcy, the Cuban question and the Ostend Manifesto. Political Science Quarterly, 8(1), 1–32.
- Woods, M. E. (2011). "The indignation of freedom-loving people": The caning of Charles Sumner and emotion in antebellum politics. Journal of Social History, 44(3), 689–705.
- Woods, M. E. (2020). Arguing until doomsday: Stephen Douglas, Jefferson Davis, and the struggle for American democracy. University of North Carolina Press.

=== Expansion, secession and slavery ===
- Balcerski, T. J. (2019). "A general concurrence in the propriety of the repeal": Male friendship, party, and section in the Kansas-Nebraska bill. Civil War History, 65(2), 157–183.
- Campney, B. M. S. (2024). "Driven out on the old charge of being a rebel": White-on-white sectional violence and the "long" Bleeding Kansas. Civil War History, 70(1), 27–49.
- Carey, A. G. (1995). Too southern to be Americans: Proslavery politics and the failure of the Know-Nothing party in Georgia, 1854-1856. Civil War History, 41(1), 22–40.
- Childers, C. (2012). The failure of popular sovereignty: Slavery, manifest destiny, and the radicalization of southern politics. University Press of Kansas.
- Cooper, W. J., Jr. (1978). The South and the politics of slavery, 1828–1856. Louisiana State University Press.
- Earle, J., & Mutti Burke, D. (Eds.). (2013). Bleeding Kansas, bleeding Missouri: The long Civil War on the border. University Press of Kansas.
- Epps, K. (2016). Slavery on the periphery: The Kansas-Missouri border in the antebellum and Civil War eras. University of Georgia Press.
- Etcheson, N. (2000). "Our lives, our fortunes, and our sacred honors": The Kansas civil war and the revolutionary tradition. American Nineteenth Century History, 1(1), 62–81.
- Etcheson, N. (2004). Bleeding Kansas: Contested liberty in the Civil War era. University Press of Kansas.
- Fehrenbacher, D. E. (1978). The Dred Scott case: Its significance in American law and politics. Oxford University Press.
- Foner, E. (1970). Free soil, free labor, free men: The ideology of the Republican Party before the Civil War. Oxford University Press.
- Freehling, W. W. (2007). The road to disunion: Vol. 2. Secessionists triumphant, 1854–1861. Oxford University Press.
- Hodder, F. H. (1925). The railroad background of the Kansas-Nebraska Act. The Mississippi Valley Historical Review, 12(1), 3–22.
- Janes, H. L. (1907). The Black Warrior affair. The American Historical Review, 12(2), 280–298.
- Johannsen, R. W. (1953). The Kansas-Nebraska Act and the Pacific Northwest frontier. Pacific Historical Review, 22(2), 129–141.
- Karp, M. (2016). This vast southern empire: Slaveholders at the helm of American foreign policy. Harvard University Press.
- Learned, H. B. (1922). The relation of Philip Phillips to the repeal of the Missouri Compromise in 1854. The Mississippi Valley Historical Review, 8(4), 303–317.
- Levine, B. (2001). Conservatism, nativism, and slavery: Thomas R. Whitney and the origins of the Know-Nothing party. The Journal of American History, 88(2), 455–488.
- Maginnes, D. R. (1971). The case of the court house rioters in the rendition of the fugitive slave Anthony Burns, 1854. The Journal of Negro History, 56(1), 31–42.
- Maltz, E. M. (2007). Dred Scott and the politics of slavery. University Press of Kansas.
- Maltz, E. M. (2010). Fugitive slave on trial: The Anthony Burns case and abolitionist outrage. University Press of Kansas.
- May, R. E. (1973). The southern dream of a Caribbean empire, 1854–1861. Louisiana State University Press.
- Moore, J. P. (1955). Pierre Soule: Southern expansionist and promoter. The Journal of Southern History, 21(2), 203–223.
- Morrison, M. A. (1997). Slavery and the American West: The eclipse of manifest destiny and the coming of the Civil War. University of North Carolina Press.
- Pierson, M. D. (1995). "All southern society is assailed by the foulest charges": Charles Sumner's "The crime against Kansas" and the escalation of Republican anti-slavery rhetoric. The New England Quarterly, 68(4), 531–557.
- Potter, D. M. (1976). The impending crisis, 1848–1861 (D. E. Fehrenbacher, Ed.). Harper & Row.
- Quaife, M. M. (1920). Bleeding Kansas and the Pottawatomie murders. The Mississippi Valley Historical Review, 6(4), 556–560.
- Radan, P. (2023). Creating a more perfect slaveholders' union: Slavery, the Constitution, and secession in antebellum America. University Press of Kansas.
- Rawley, J. A. (1969). Race and politics: "Bleeding Kansas" and the coming of the Civil War. J. B. Lippincott.
- Russel, R. R. (1963). The issues in the congressional struggle over the Kansas-Nebraska bill, 1854. The Journal of Southern History, 29(2), 187–210.
- Sewell, R. H. (1976). Ballots for freedom: Antislavery politics in the United States, 1837–1860. Oxford University Press.
- Shapiro, S. (1959). The rendition of Anthony Burns. The Journal of Negro History, 44(1), 34–51.
- Smith, M. P. (2021). The Young America movement, the Koszta affair of 1853, and the construction of nationalism before the Civil War. Journal of the Early Republic, 41(1), 87–114.
- Varon, E. R. (2008). Disunion! The coming of the American Civil War, 1789–1859. University of North Carolina Press.
- Wolff, G. W. (1972). Party and section: The Senate and the Kansas-Nebraska bill. Civil War History, 18(4), 293–311.
- Wunder, J. R., & Ross, J. M. (Eds.). (2008). The Nebraska-Kansas Act of 1854. University of Nebraska Press.

== Historiography ==
- Bogue, A. G. (1968). United States: The "new" political history. Journal of Contemporary History, 3(1), 5–27.
- Childers, C. (2011). Interpreting popular sovereignty: A historiographical essay. Civil War History, 57(1), 48–70.
- Foner, E. (1974). The causes of the American Civil War: Recent interpretations and new directions. Civil War History, 20(3), 197–214.
- Formisano, R. P. (1994). The invention of the ethnocultural interpretation. The American Historical Review, 99(2), 453–477.
- Nichols, R. F. (1956). The Kansas-Nebraska Act: A century of historiography. The Mississippi Valley Historical Review, 43(2), 187–212.
- Silbey, J. H. (1964). The Civil War synthesis in American political history. Civil War History, 10(2), 130–140.
- Towers, F. (2011). Partisans, new history, and modernization: The historiography of the Civil War's causes, 1861–2011. The Journal of the Civil War Era, 1(2), 237–264.
- Woods, M. E. (2012). What twenty-first-century historians have said about the causes of disunion: A Civil War sesquicentennial review of the recent literature. The Journal of American History, 99(2), 415–439.

== Primary sources ==
- Hawthorne, N. (1852). Life of Franklin Pierce. Ticknor, Reed, and Fields.
- Pierce, F. (1820–1869). Franklin Pierce papers (MSS36194) [Manuscript collection]. Manuscript Division, Library of Congress.

== See also ==
- 1852 United States presidential election
- Jane Pierce
- Ostend Manifesto
- Young America movement
